= 1970s in fashion =

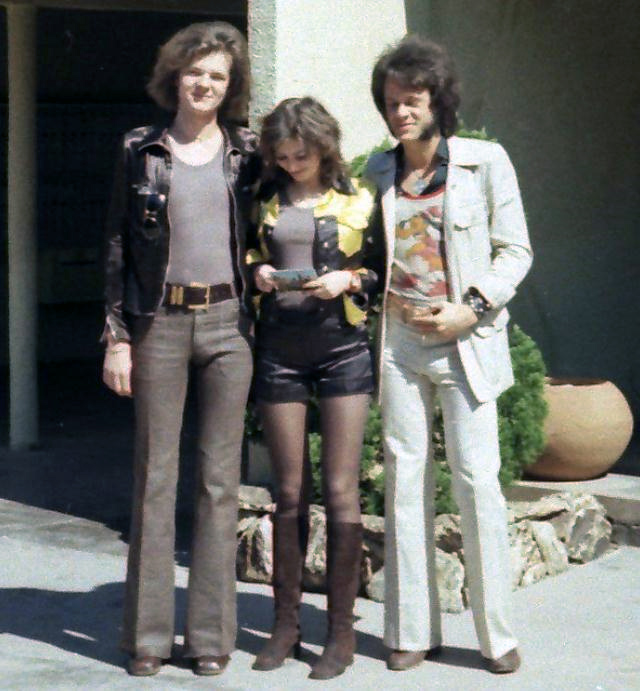
In 1971 hotpants, long sideburns and bell-bottomed trousers were popular fashion trends

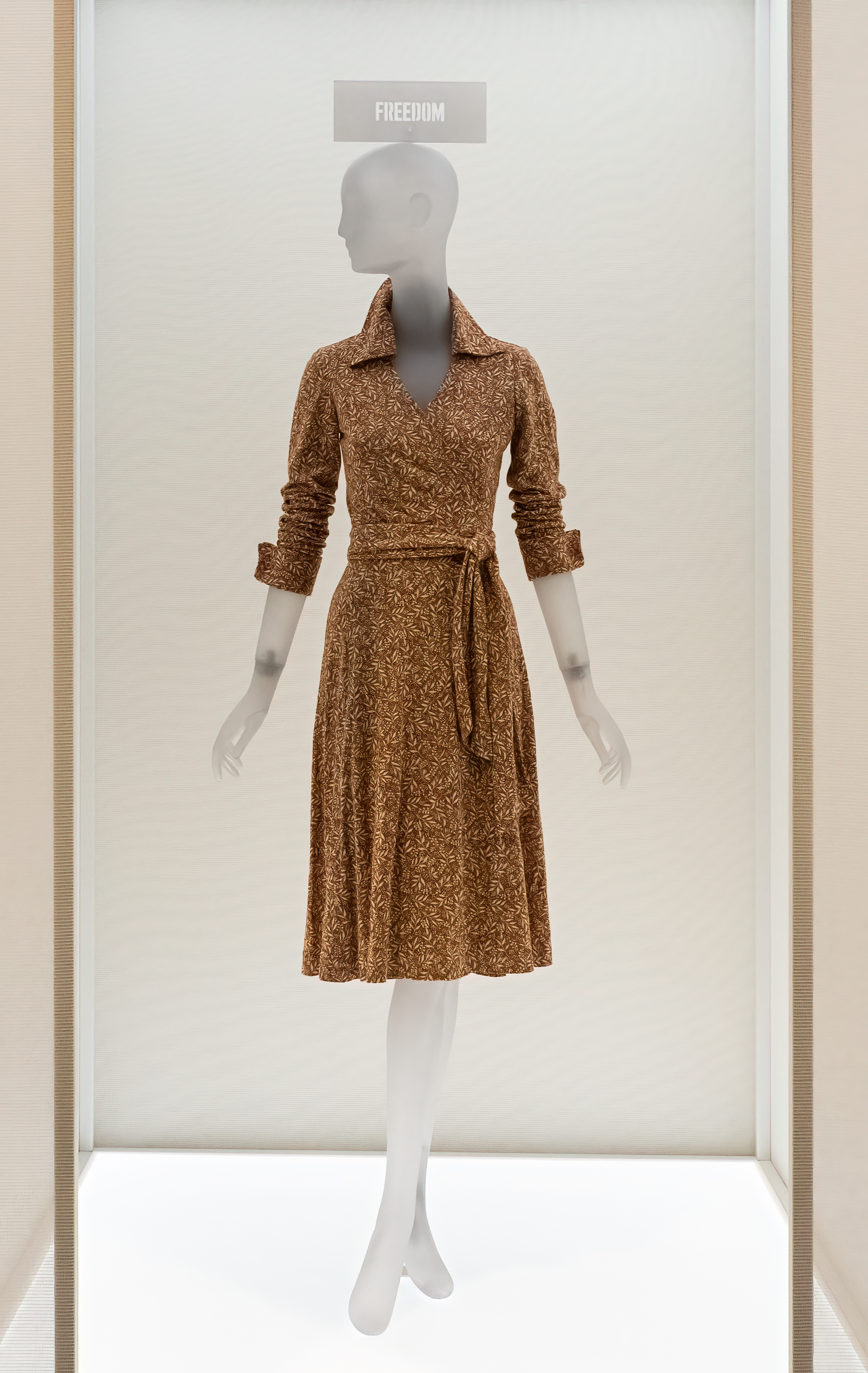
Diane von Fürstenberg's wrap dress, designed in the 1970s

Western fashion in the 1970s was diverse, characterized by mass-production and developing the youth trends of the 1960s for wider markets. In the early 1970s, Vogue proclaimed "There are no rules in the fashion game now" due to overproduction flooding the market with affordable synthetic clothing. Common items included mini skirts, bell-bottoms popularized by hippies, vintage clothing from the 1950s and earlier, and the androgynous glam rock and disco styles that introduced platform shoes, bright colors, glitter, and satin.

Many societal trends of the 1960s grew stronger in the 1970s and continued to influence fashion, with women having discarded cumbersome and uncomfortable undergarments by the early 1970s, including bras, and overall favoring more comfort and mobility in dress and in life than had been the norm as recently as the 1950s. Decades-old standards of formality continued to be relaxed or dispensed with, with trousers for women outnumbering skirts and dresses on city streets for the first time in Western fashion history. Environmental concerns that had arisen in the 1960s got stronger in the 1970s, with the 1970 first Earth Day the largest one in history and ecological thinking reflected in fashion in the form of more natural fibers and a turn away from the wearing of furs from endangered animals.

New technologies brought about advances such as mass production, higher efficiency, generating higher standards and uniformity. Generally the most famous silhouette of the mid and late 1970s for both genders was that of tight on top and loose at the bottom. The 1970s also saw the birth of the indifferent, anti-conformist casual chic approach to fashion, which consisted of sweaters, T-shirts, jeans and sneakers. One notable fashion designer to emerge into the spotlight during this time was Diane von Fürstenberg, who popularized, among other things, the jersey "wrap dress". Von Fürstenberg's wrap dress design, essentially a robe, was among the most popular fashion styles of the 1970s for women and would also be credited as a symbol of women's liberation. The French designer Yves Saint Laurent and the American designer Halston both observed and embraced the changes that were happening in society, especially the huge growth of women's rights and the youth counterculture. They successfully adapted their design aesthetics to accommodate the changes that the market was aiming for.

Top fashion models in the 1970s were Lauren Hutton, Margaux Hemingway, Beverly Johnson, Gia Carangi, Janice Dickinson, Patti Hansen, Cheryl Tiegs, Jerry Hall, and Iman.

== Women ==
=== Early 1970s (1970–1973) ===
==== Hippie look ====
- The 1970s began with a continuation of the hippie look from the 1960s, giving a distinct ethnic flavor. Popular early 1970s fashions for women included Tie dye shirts, Mexican 'peasant' blouses, folk-embroidered Hungarian blouses, ponchos, capes, and military surplus clothing. Bottom attire for women during this time included bell-bottoms, gauchos, frayed jeans, midi skirts, and ankle-length maxi dresses. Hippie clothing during this time was made in extremely bright colors, as well as Indian patterns, Native American patterns, and floral patterns.
- Women's hippie accessories of the early 1970s included chokers, dog collars, handcrafted neck ornaments, and accessories made from natural elements like wood, shells, stones, feathers, Indian beads and leather. All of these replaced standard jewelry. Unisex hippie accessories included headbands, floppy hats, flowing scarves, Birkenstocks, earth shoes, authentic beaded and fringed Native American buckskin moccasins, including knee-high boot versions, and sandals, including tire-soled versions and huaraches. The back-to-nature direction of the times meant that there was also a lot of going barefoot.

==== Glamour wear ====
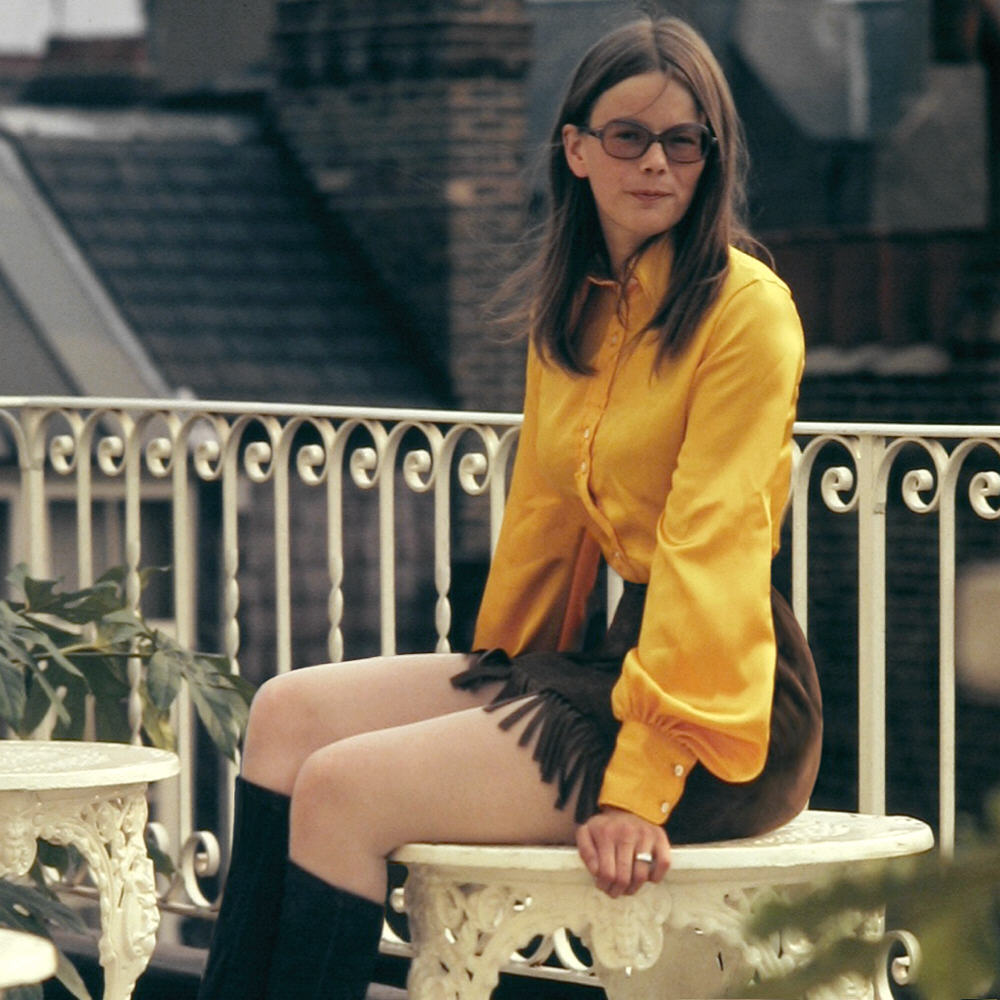
By the early 1970s, miniskirts had reached an all-time popularity. This young English woman is wearing a fringed suede miniskirt, 1971.

- Although the hippie look was widespread, it was not adopted by everyone. Many women still continued to dress up with more glamorous clothes, inspired by 1940s movie star glamour. Other women just adopted simple casual fashions, or combined new garments with carefully chosen secondhand or vintage clothing from the 1930s, 1950s and 1960s.
- Glamorous women's accessories of the early 1970s included cloche hats or turbans, pearl earrings, necklaces, bracelets, feather boas, black-veiled hats, clogs, wedgies, cork-soled platforms, and chunky high heels. Golden chains, gold-button earrings and rhinestone clips started to become popular again in 1973 after several years of homemade jewelry.

==== Trousers and hemlines ====
- The 1970s was the first decade in Western fashion history that women wore more trousers/pants than skirts and were free to do so in all settings. In the first half of the 1960s, designers Norman Norell and André Courrèges had promoted pants at all levels of formality, and by the end of the 1960s other designers had followed their lead and women on the street began wearing them increasingly as well, challenging dress codes at establishments throughout society. By the early 1970s, all barriers had been dropped and women wore pants everywhere, including jeans. The switch to trousers was partly due to the fashion industry in the year 1970 trying to push all women out of miniskirts and into calf-length midiskirts, which came to be known as the "midi debacle" because women's resistance to it was so strong, particularly in the US, that it almost ruined the US fashion industry as women refused to buy the long skirts that manufacturers had stocked up on. From 1970 to 1972, many women continued to wear miniskirts, some took up the new longer skirts, but even more women simply switched over to trousers and jeans. Though a number of pant styles were popular and fashionable during this time, including knee-length knickers and gauchos, the most common style of trouser in the early seventies was fitted at the hips and then flared gently to a foot-covering hem, a look given impetus when Yves Saint Laurent endorsed it in all his collections in 1968.

==== General trends ====
- More simple early 1970s trends for women included fitted blazers (coming in a multitude of fabrics along with wide lapels), long and short dresses, mini skirts, maxi evening gowns, hot pants (extremely brief, tight-fitting shorts) paired with skin-tight T-shirts, his & hers outfits (matching outfits that were nearly identical to each other), and flared pants. Pastel colors were most commonly used for this style of clothing, such as mauve, peach, apple green, pink, yellow, white, wheat, camel, gray, and baby blue. Rust, tangerine, copper, forest green, and pistachio became more popularized from 1973 onwards. Sweaters were a huge phenomenon in the early 1970s, often outfits being judged entirely by the sweater. This fragmented into more styles, such as turtleneck sweaters, sweater coats, sweater dresses, floor-length sweaters, and even sweater suits. Many of them were trimmed with fur, especially faux. Chunky, shawl-collared, belted cardigans, often in brown and white, were also commonplace.
- Jeans were ubiquitous, characteristic of the period. Standard jean denim during this period might be pre-faded and softened via pre-washing, but it was still of a thick, sturdy weight designed to last, not yet thinned to virtual leotard weights like it would be in the 2000s. Both men and women wore their shorts at the upper thigh, with cut-off blue-jean shorts extremely popular, usually worn with t-shirts or tank tops. Women frequently paired them with halter tops that were often just the tops of string bikinis. The popularity of jeans led to blue denim being used for many other garments, as well as other fabrics being given a blue denim look. On the feet, platform shoes were widespread in a variety of styles, including clog-like forms and sandals, with relatively wide straps but never spindly heels; heels were always thick and chunky. The young paired these with colorful, often brightly striped knee-socks, some with separate toes like gloves for the feet, called toe socks.

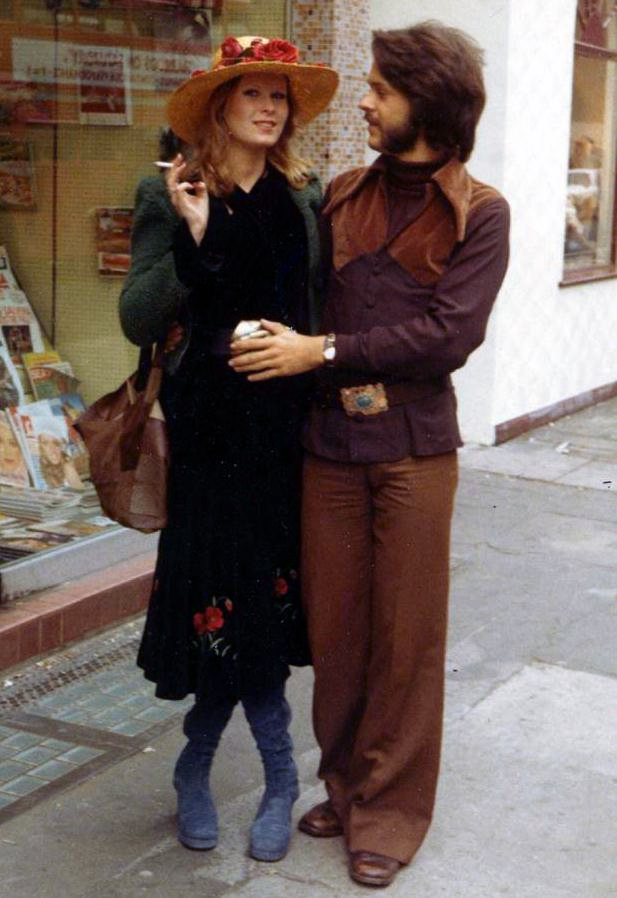
Two Swedish models in Kings Road, London, 1971; Efva Attling in a "midi" dress.

- In the early 1970s boots were at the height of their popularity, continuing onward from the mid-1960s. Women had boots for every occasion, with a wide variety of styles being sold in stores for affordable prices. Despite the wide variety, the most popular boots were Go-go boots, crinkle boots (boots with a shiny wet look that was wrinkled), stretch boots, and granny boots (1920s style lace-up boots that ended just below the knees).

=== Mid-1970s (1974–1976) ===
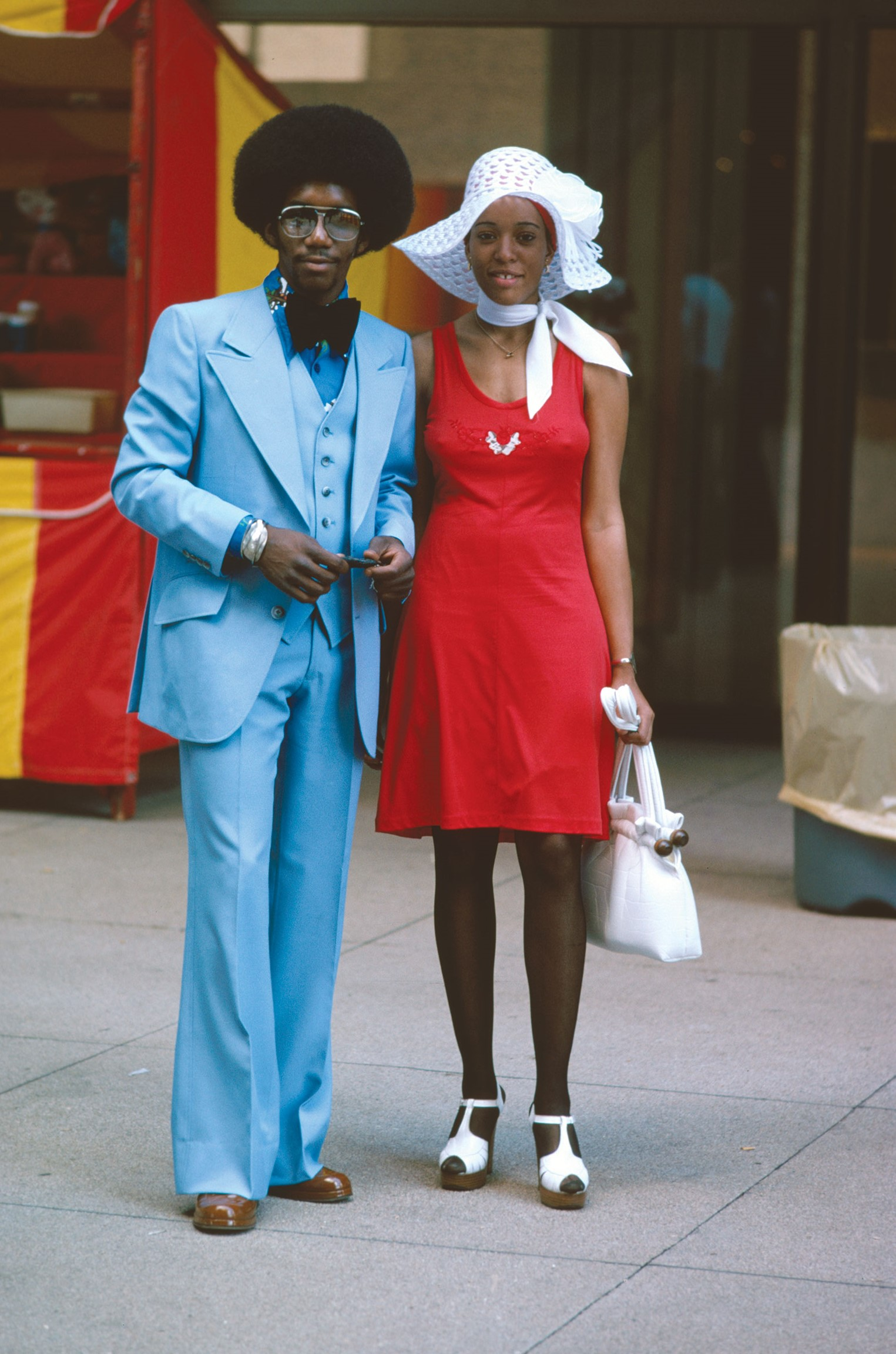
African American couple, Michigan Avenue, Chicago, July 1975

==== Casual looks ====
- By 1974, the T-shirt was no longer considered underwear, and was by then made in elaborate designs such as slogans, sports teams, and other styles. Around the same time the looser, more flowy shirts of the early 1970s had given way to fitted tops.
- By the mid-1970s, the hippie look had completely disappeared, although casual looks continued. In the mid-1970s women wore sweaters, T-shirts, cardigans, kimono, graphic T-shirts and sweaters, jeans, khakis, gauchos, workmen's clothes, and vintage clothing. A denim emphasis continued from the early seventies, particularly strong in 1973 to '75, with denim and denim-look fabrics of various intensities of indigo paired with blue jeans, usually flared, and denim skirts in below-knee lengths. In 1975, the slim-legged jean style known as the cigarette-leg was introduced, a style that would dominate the end of the decade. Around 1976, casual fashion adopted a Parisan peasant look. This included capes, turbans, puffy skirts and shirts with billowing sleeves.
- In the mid-1970s, accessories were generally not worn, adopting a minimalistic approach to fashion akin to that of the 1950s. The most commonly seen form of jewelry was a simple, thin, unobtrusive gold neckchain, sometimes in silver, worn under the collar against the skin by both men and women throughout the decade but becoming really ubiquitous starting in the mid-seventies. White puka shell necklaces were also worn by both sexes. Small leather shoulder bags were worn by women everywhere, and popular shoes included Mary Janes, knee-high boots with rounded toes, including Dingo boots and Frye boots (often with pants tucked in), platform shoes and sandals, wedge-heeled espadrilles that often had long cords to wrap around the ankle, Birkenstocks, Famolares, and loafers. Despite the lack of accessories, the mood ring was a big fad in the mid-1970s.

==== Active wear ====
- Clean-cut, all-American active wear for women became increasingly popular from 1975 onwards. The biggest phenomenon of this trend was the jumpsuit, popular from 1975 onwards. Jumpsuits were almost always flared in the legs, and sleeves varied from being completely sleeveless to having extremely long bell-sleeves. Other sportswear trends included tracksuits, tunic shirts, crop tops, tube tops, sweatshirts, hip-huggers, low rise pants, and leisure suits. This continued into the 1980s.
- Accessories were less of an importance during this time, but two very desirable accessories included sneakers and tennis headbands.

==== Tailored styles ====
- As the divorce rate rose and the marriage rate declined in the mid-70s, women were forced to work in order to support the nuclear family. The progressive addition of women to the work force altered shopping styles and fashion. Working women shopped on weekends and in the evenings. Feminized men's business suits such as tailored jackets, midi-skirts, and fitted blouses were their go-to choice as to "dress for success."

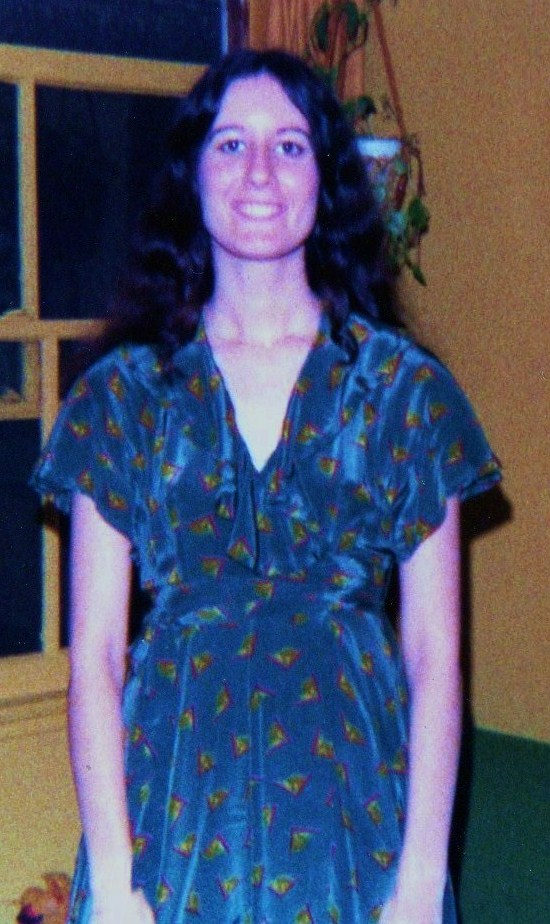
A young woman wearing a wrap dress.

- Starting in 1975, women's semi-formal wear became more tailored and sharp. This included a lot of layering, with women wearing two blouses at once, multiple sweaters, pants underneath tunic dresses, and jumpers worn over long, fitted dresses. The 1970s also featured some of the most scandalous dresses worn publicly in American history up to that point. Other clothes worn in this style include suede coats, peacoats, blazers, cowl-neck sweaters, pencil skirts, backless dresses, extremely low-cut dresses, palazzo pants, tube dresses, evening gowns, jacket dresses, and pinstriped pantsuits. Women's dresses in the mid-1970s were dominated by pastel colors, but Asian patterns were also common.
- Accessories for the more formal styles included high-heels (both low and high, mostly thick-heeled), turbans, and leather shoulder bags. Boots continued their popularity in the mid-1970s. This trend expanded to other styles, most notably the wedge heel (arguably the most popular women's shoe of the mid-1970s). Boots became rounder, chunkier, heavier, and thicker, and were more expensive than they were in the early 1970s. Popular boots of the mid-1970s included wedge boots, ankle boots, platform boots, and cowboy boots. The A/W Haute Couture Collection "Opium Collection" by the French designer Yves Saint Laurent was inspired by the Chinese culture and history.

==== Disco look ====
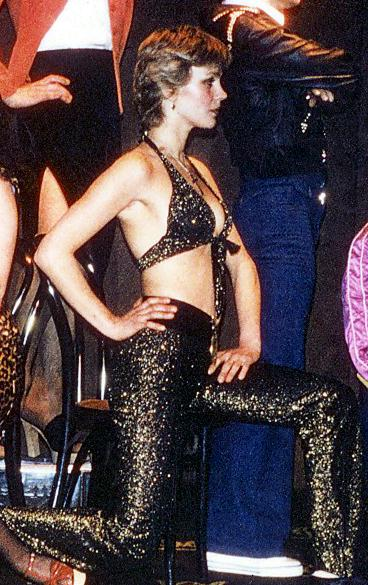
Swedish model Ulla Jones dressed in a lurex halter top and matching flared trousers

- The disco music genre spawned its own fashion craze in the mid- to late 1970s. Young people gathered in nightclubs dressed in new disco clothing that was designed to show off the body and shine under dance-floor lights. Disco fashion featured fancy clothes made from man-made materials. The most famous disco look for women was the jersey wrap dress, a knee-length dress with a cinched waist. Essentially a robe, it became an extremely popular item, as it flattered a number of different body types and sizes, and could be worn both to the office by day, and to nightclubs and discos by night.
- Disco fashion was generally inspired by clothing from the early 1960s. Disco clothes worn by women included tube tops, sequined halterneck shirts, blazers, spandex short shorts, loose pants, form-fitting spandex pants, maxi skirts and dresses with long thigh slits, jersey wrap dresses, and evening dresses. Shoes ranged from knee-high boots to kitten heels, but the most commonly worn shoes were ones that had thick heels and were often made with transparent plastic.
- During the 1974-79 peak of disco's popularity, a variety of looks could be seen at these clubs, generally following the trends of the time, ranging from jeans-and-t-shirts to elegant high-fashion outfits to playful costumes. On televised popular-music dance shows of the seventies like Soul Train, American Bandstand, Dance Fever, and others, you'd see scattered pairs of chicly dressed people couples-dancing, the women's skirts swirling over their high-heeled sandals; people in mid-seventies casualwear like gauchos/culottes and cowlneck tops with full knee-high boots; couples in matching jeans, t-shirts, and trainers; people in gym shorts and tube tops; people dressed as sailors and cowboys; etc, comfort and practicality being paramount for the era's active dancing. By the late seventies, many discos maintained dress codes, and some, most famously Studio 54, employed doormen to restrict entry only to the fashionably dressed. Brief disco fads included overalls and coveralls worn by both sexes in the mid-seventies for athletic funk dancing and hand-held fans waved by women in the late seventies, all following fashion trends of the period. Along with wrapdresses, women adapted dancewear for discos, with maillots and leotards from Capezio, Danskin, and other labels worn under fashionable skirts, gym shorts, and full-cut blouses. For most of the period, women wore "disco bags": envelope-size leather bags threaded onto long, narrow straps and worn across the body or as belts while dancing.

==== The Big Look or Soft Look ====
- The leading high-fashion trend of the mid-seventies, extending from 1973 and 1974 through the first half of 1978, was known as the Big Look or Soft Look, with big meaning voluminous. This was a loosening and increase in scale of the popular, casual peasant styles of the late sixties and early seventies and a reduction and elimination of internal structure like linings and padding to achieve what was known as an unconstructed look and feel. Essential features of the look were thin fabrics in natural fibers and layering. Introduced by designer Kenzo Takada in 1973, carried further by Karl Lagerfeld in 1974, adapted for the US by Geoffrey Beene shortly thereafter, and endorsed in silhouette the same year by the most influential designer of the time, Yves Saint Laurent, it came to influence everyone from Calvin Klein to Mary McFadden to Givenchy to Perry Ellis, who was probably the look's biggest US exponent.

=== Late 1970s (1977–1979) ===
==== Relaxed look ====
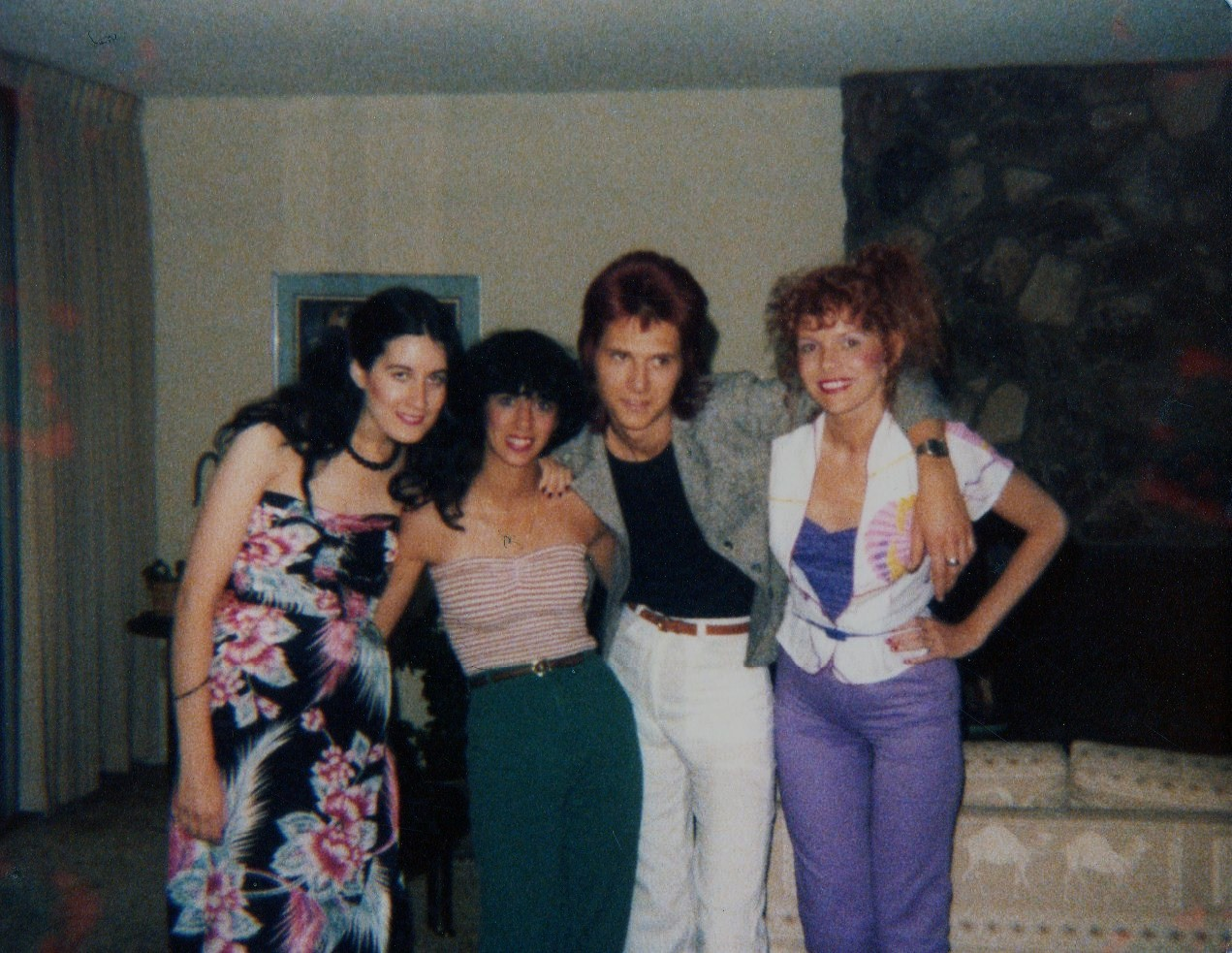
Two women in 1979 wear the trendy tube tops, while the woman on the far left is wearing a rayon strapless dress

- In 1977, mass-market fashion became more baggy as the Big Look that had been dominant in high fashion since 1974 filtered down to the public. This caused much controversy, as women with trim figures bemoaned not being able to flaunt them while heavier women complained the looser clothes made them look even larger. To make up for this, it became fashionable to show more skin. This resulted in shirts being unbuttoned, sleeves being rolled up, and tops being strapless, transparent, and lacy. Shiny satin and gold colors were also used to make up for the lack of tighter clothing. Also in 1977, puffy, quilted, down-filled coats to the calf became popular during that year's very cold winter, originating in New York. By 1977, pants were only flared slightly and sometimes not flared at all.
- Women's fashions in the late 1970s included cowl-neck shirts and sweaters, pantsuits, leisure suits, tracksuits, sundresses worn with tight T-shirts, strapless tops, lower-cut shirts, cardigans, velour shirts, tunics, robes, crop tops, tube tops, embroidered vests and jeans, knee-length skirts, loose satin pants, designer jeans, culottes, daisy dukes, and tennis shorts. This continued into the 1980s.
- Accessories included scarves, gold jewelry, flowers, ankle boots, 1940s style hats (often tilted), skinny and wide belts, boas, braceleted gloves, spike-heeled sandals, mules, ankle-strapped shoes, waist cinchers, and obi wraps. Color had almost completely faded from fashion in the late 1970s, with earthy tones like browns, light blues, tans, grays, whites, and blacks making a comeback. In the second half of 1977 and very early 1978, a common fashion accessory was an off-white, open-weave, sweater-knit muffler knotted at both ends and hanging down the front of the torso to a little above the waist, usually under the lapels of a tweedy jacket, worn by both men and women.
- The frenzy for boots had cooled down by the late 1970s, but they remained popular, especially in the winter. They became less flamboyant by that point in time, and they mostly came in black, brown, or burgundy. The most popular boots were either knee-high or reached the mid-calf, and were made in leather, suede, urethane, or rubber. The toes were rounded, and zippers were on the side. The heels were usually only 2–4 inches, and the heels were sometimes even flat. Women continued to wear wedge heels and ankle boots, as well as knee-high boots with thick kitten heels.
- In Pakistan, Afghanistan and Iran, many liberal women wore short skirts, flower printed hippie dresses, flared trousers, and went out in public without the hijab. This changed following the military dictatorship in Pakistan, the mujahideen government in Afghanistan, (Note: Which took over Afghanistan in 1992, not by the end of the 70s) and Iranian revolution of 1979, when traditional conservative attire including the abaya, jilbab and niqab made a comeback.

==== One-piece swimsuits ====
- In 1977, American actress Farrah Fawcett popularized the one-piece swimsuit which in turn launched the trend for the maillot. This was, when it resurged in the 1970s, a sexy, tight swimsuit, with deep neckline and high-cut legs, worn by young women and girls in lieu of the bikini, although it did not entirely replace the latter. This continued into the 1980s.

==== The pantsuit ====
- By the late 1970s the pantsuit had become acceptable business wear for executive women. This was due to the success of Yves Saint Laurent's "Le smoking" tuxedo with silk lapels designed to allow any ash falling from cigarettes to slide off, keeping the jacket clean. Business Insider pointed out that wearing the pantsuit was more of a political statement than a fashion one. "So, dressing in a YSL trouser suit declared the wearer was irreverent, daring, and on the cutting edge of fashion, whilst suggesting their alignment with burgeoning feminist politics – le smoking effectively demanded: 'If men can wear this, why can't I?'" With the increase of women entering the workface, they were in search for a new symbol that proved they were as serious and powerful as the men they shared elevators with. The only solution to convince male-dominated workspaces was to copy their tailored suits. The jacket could be either short and shapely or long and lean.
- Movies like Annie Hall fought gender ideals by portraying a woman who wore men's clothing on the daily basis. This movie took a big inspiration from the decade and because of its success, continues to influence fashion. Skirts, when worn, were often knee-length and could possibly have a front or side slit that put a subtle emphasis on the legs. To offset the more traditionally masculine look of "business suit style", women like Margot Kidder in Superman experimented with hats, high heels, ruffles that peaked out from the jacket and large jewelry to keep a confident, yet feminine, look intact.

==== Designer jeans ====
- In 1978, the first designer jeans were introduced and immediately became popular, designers like Calvin Klein, Gloria Vanderbilt, and Fiorucci advertising their name on the back of the fashionable cigarette-leg, usually dark blue denim jean of the time. In the US in 1978, they were often worn with hems rolled up to or just above the ankle to show off the popular Candie's slides on the feet.
- From 1979 to 1981, a popular style was jeans with a high-ish waist and full cut through the hips and thighs that tapered to a narrow but not tight hem hitting at the ankle or just above, called "baggies." They were paired in the fall with rustic-looking sweaters with shoulders fashionably widened via single, top-of-the-sleeve tucks or pleats called "dimples" by their creator Perry Ellis, and the shoes worn with them were often high-vamped pumps with low cone heels inspired by Maud Frizon, jazz oxfords, or flat, lace-up ankle boots.

==== Shoulder pads ====
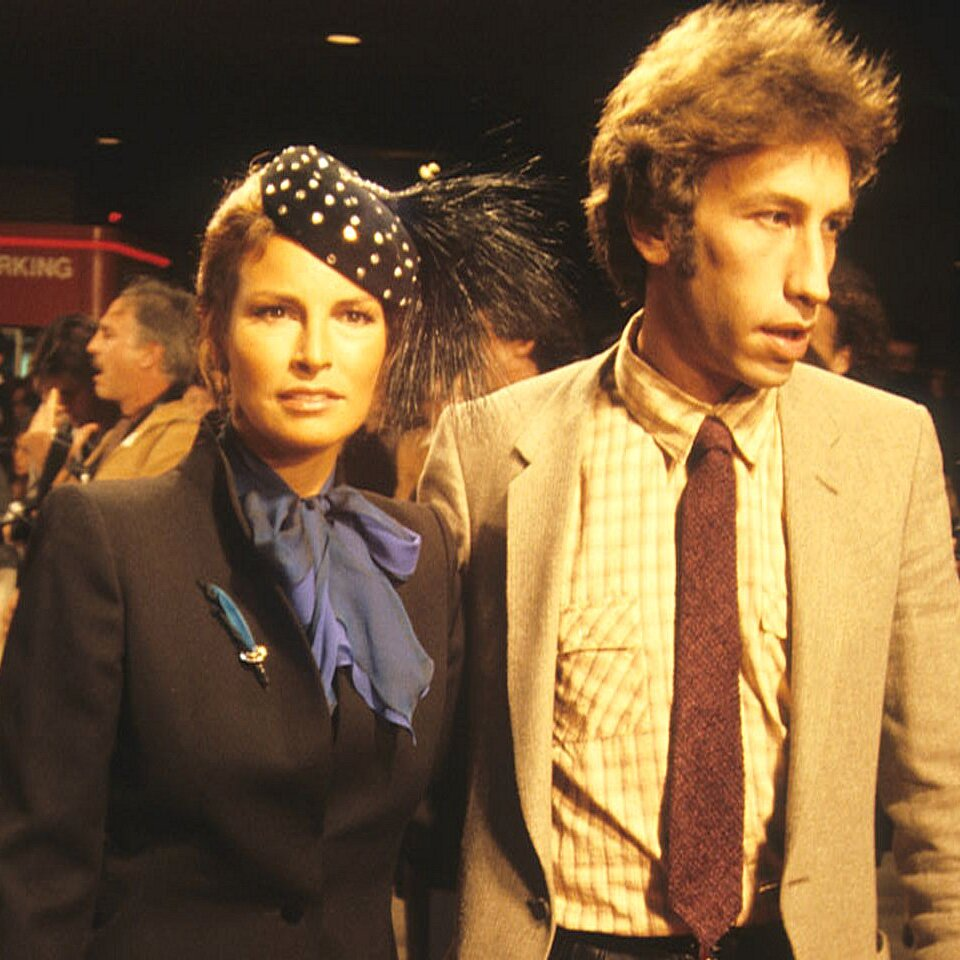
Actress Raquel Welch in 1979, wearing the shoulder pads and "retro"-look tilted hat favored by designers at the time

- Styles became curvier for fall of 1978, with shoulder pads, tighter skirts, and narrower waistlines. The silhouette that resulted was an inverted triangle. This change to big shoulders did not arise from women's demands, nor from what women on the street were wearing, the way miniskirts, jeans, pants, hippie clothing, office blazers, and more comfortable undergarments had in the 1960s and earlier '70s. Though decades later it would be claimed that the big shoulders of this period were part of an attempt by women to assert a "power" look as they worked their way up career ladders, women already had appropriate but comfortable blazers for that. The huge shoulder pad look came solely from designers. They united in showing the look in Fall 1978, a few presenting shoulders three feet wide, and there was strong resistance. Since the clothes were less comfortable and more restrictive than the clothes of the '70s and resembled too much the man-focused styles of the 1940s and '50s, this shoulder-padded look was initially a hard sell to the public, though women didn't demonstrate against big shoulder pads as they had against the midiskirt in 1970; they simply refused to buy the look. Some designers, notably Perry Ellis, Norma Kamali, Calvin Klein, and Giorgio Armani, made it more appealing by keeping it comfortably wearable and just adding reasonably proportioned shoulder pads to slightly slimmed-down versions of the easy clothes women had been wearing during the decade, and this approach was a bit more positively received by the general public. As had happened with calf-length skirts in the early seventies, so many designers continued to present really huge shoulders into the eighties, however, that women were left with little option but to conform to it, which they finally did in the early eighties, so much so that big shoulder pads became common in and characteristic of the 1980s, seen on everyone from political leaders to actors in TV shows like Dynasty to your coworkers and family. At the end of the seventies, though, in 1978 and '79, much of the public still considered it strange, though they had gotten the message that it was to be the new look.
- This revival of 1940s and '50s styles included the heavily structured and shaped strapless tops seen in bodices of the forties and fifties, achieved with boning and other forms of stiffening. During the 1970s, the most common strapless top had been the casual-looking, minimally constructed, elasticized tube top, so this revival of structured, bodice-like forms seemed like a real throwback and was not immediately taken up by the public. Designer Karl Lagerfeld, however, made it more comfortable by lining it with fiberfill and giving it the name bustier and as such it would become very popular during the 1980s, especially associated with singer Madonna. At the end of the seventies, however, it was seen only on runways, not yet widely worn, as the public still preferred the softer, more comfortable tube top when they wanted straplessness.
- Designers also began trying to get women back into bras as part of their 1978-79 revival of styles of the 1940s and '50s. As noted earlier, women had been discarding bras since the late 1960s and by the mid-1970s bralessness was quite common. As with so many of the casual trends of the seventies, this bothered some designers and they began trying to make bras more appealing to women again at the end of the decade. They initially attempted this by advocating an openly sexy look of bras worn on their own underneath low-closing versions of the new shoulder-padded suit jackets, things like black lace bras worn with slit pencil skirts. As with the shoulder pads, this wouldn't initially catch on with the public but would during the eighties, forever-after relegating bralessness to seventies nostalgia. At the end of the seventies, though, it was just a runway phenomenon, not seen on the street except occasionally at discos.
- Footwear worn with these styles initially, in 1978, continued the very bare, high-heeled sandal that had been popular throughout the mid-seventies, now with a slightly higher heel and in more dressed-up materials and colors like black and metallics. These often had ankle straps and the heel fell straight down in the back rather than being underslung. In 1979, the higher-vamped, vaguely 1950s-looking pump that would characterize the eighties would appear, often in bright colors and marked by the underslung cone heels introduced by Maud Frizon. Open-toed pumps were a particular focus in 1979. After dominating fashion since the early 1960s and being extremely popular with designers and the public as recently as 1977, knee-high boots were no longer in with designers as they promoted the shoulder-padded mode, replaced by boots that rose no higher than mid-calf and usually didn't rise above the ankle, resembling the demi-boots of the 1950s and barely distinguishable from the new high-vamp pumps.
- Another accessory trend that arrived with this new-old look was a determined attempt by designers to revive the wearing of dressy hats and gloves. For fall 1978, designers showed a plethora of mostly small forties- and fifties-looking hats, particularly small, tilted pillboxes, often with veils, and the fashion press claimed that there was an increase in hat sales. Though hats and gloves of this type were only rarely seen among the public in 1978 and '79, mainly as an occasional accessory with a disco outfit, these revived hat and glove styles, like big shoulder pads, would continue to be shown during the following decade, occasionally becoming somewhat popular, and would be taken up by people for whom hat- and glove-wearing was customary, particularly royalty.

== Men ==
=== Early 1970s (1970–1973) ===
==== Peacock revolution ====
- With well-paid jobs and booming businesses, young men in the UK and America explored beyond the conventional social standards of dress. In the early 1970s, satin shirts in black, and grey were popular, and often featured lace ruffles on the cuffs and neckline. Due to the colorful nature of menswear, the time period was described as the Peacock Revolution, and male trendsetters were called "Dandies", "Dudes" or "Peacocks". Typical casual wear for this time included Nehru jackets, ethnic inspired tunics, turtlenecks, candy striped blazers, winklepicker boots with Cuban heels, and hip-hugging elephant bell-bottoms. Accessories like color-matching nylon zippers and bright braided belts were common and also fitted in with the Peacock style. Suits were available in bright colors and unorthodox styles from 1970 to 1976, including shawl collars, three pieces with peak lapels, and double breasted suits made from corduroy, paisley brocade, wool blends with wide pinstripes, or crushed velvet in burgundy, teal, black, bottle green, and peacock blue. A rise of 4.4 percent in suit sales was reported by Forbes magazine. Stylish continental suits by designers Lanvin, Yves Saint Laurent and Pierre Cardin were welcomed by young men while classic suits were loved by first-timers.

==== Bright colors ====
- For the first time in decades, there was a significant shortage of raw materials and fabrics, including synthetics like vinyl and nylon. As a result, everyday designers kept things simple. The early 1970s were a continuation of late 1960s hippie fashion. For men this particularly meant bell bottom jeans, tie dye shirts, and military surplus clothing. Other early 1970s clothes for men included tweed sports jackets, khaki chinos, chunky sweaters in cream, dark green, beige and sky blue, storm coats, tartan jackets, peacoats, flannel shirts, pleated pants, baseball jackets, corduroy pants, crocheted waistcoats, striped pullover sweaters and sweater vests, tassels, belted cardigans, and hip-huggers.
- The most popular accessories of the early 1970s for men were homemade, with necklaces, headbands, and bracelets being made from all-natural materials such as wood, hemp, flowers, leather, shells, stones, and Indian beads. Unisex hippie accessories included headbands, floppy hats, and flowing scarves. Men's footwear in the early 1970s included flip-flops, oxfords, Birkenstocks, platform shoes, earth shoes, and cowboy boots.

==== Eastern fashion ====
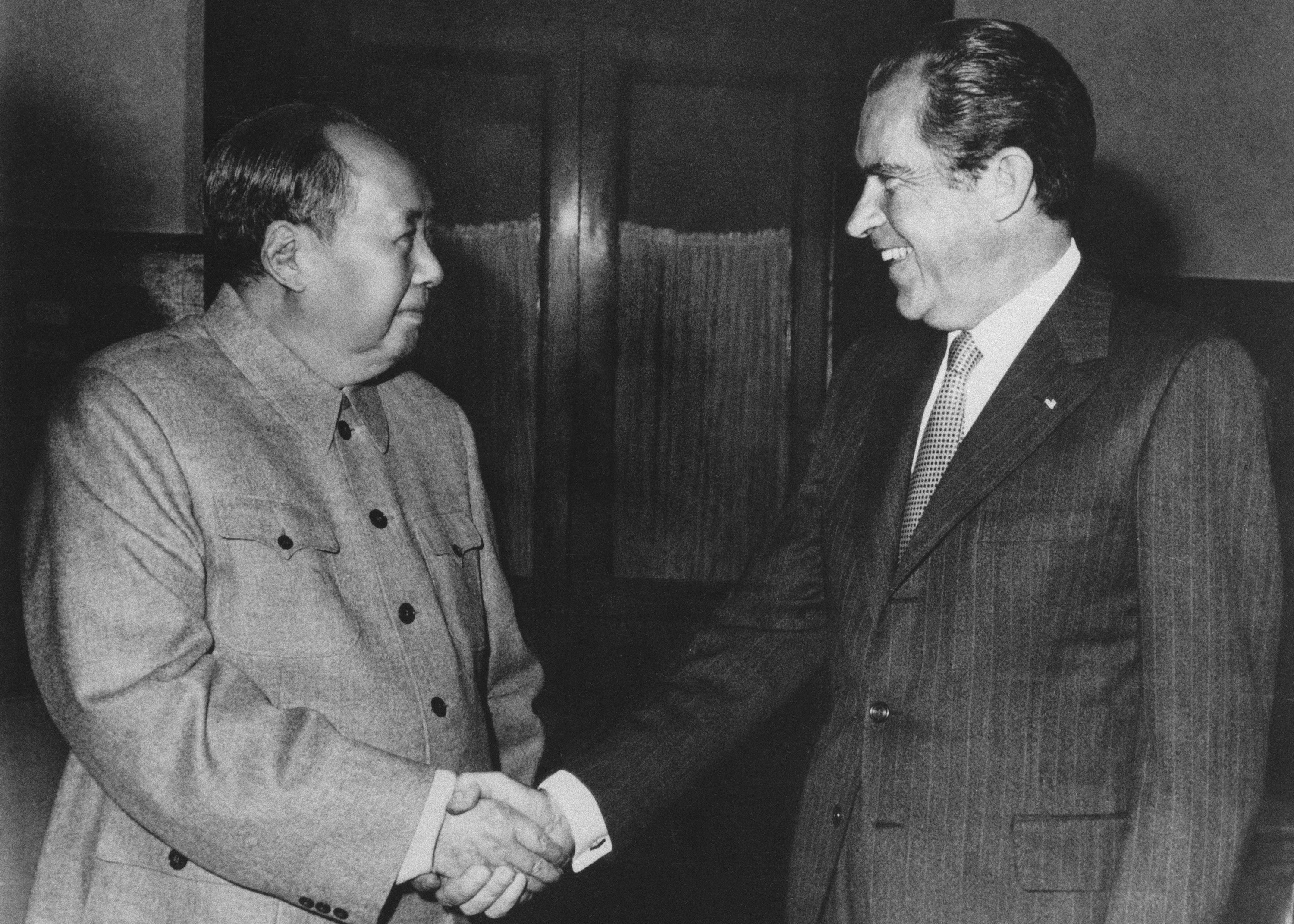
Mao Zedong wearing gray Zhongshan suit, 1972.

- Due to the ongoing Cultural Revolution in China, Western style clothing was suppressed and both sexes wore grey Mao suits until the early 1980s. The suit, unchanged since the 1940s, typically had four external pockets, five buttons, and a turn-down collar. In contrast to China, many people in Taiwan and Hong Kong abandoned the Zhongshan suit during the early 1970s due to its association with Communism, leftists, and anti-Westerners.
- In the UK, France, India and Australia, green, blue or beige safari jackets similar to the Mao suit became popular among liberal men due to their association with socialist values, travel to exotic locations, 1930s Hollywood, and Roger Moore's portrayal of James Bond and Simon Templar. These were also worn in place of the business suit in decolonised African countries, including South Africa, Rhodesia, and Mobutu's Zaire where it was known as an Abacost and paired with a leopardskin fez resembling an Astrakhan cap.

=== Mid-1970s (1974–1976) ===
==== Glam rock ====
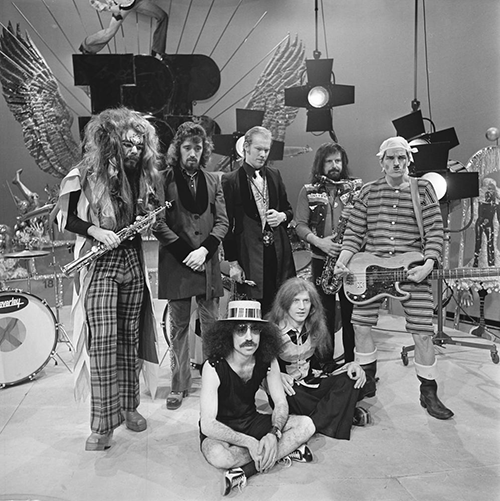
Example of glam rock costume worn by Roy Wood and Wizzard, early 1970s.

- By 1974, androgynous glam rock fashion had gone mainstream for young British people of both sexes. These included embroidered Western shirts, velvet sports coats, Royal Stewart tartan as worn by the Bay City Rollers, red or blue shawl collar tuxedo jackets, frilly shirts, high necked nehru jackets, synthetic fabrics like satin, wide kipper ties, black or tan leather jackets, silk scarfs or ascots, shawl collar sweaters, satin shirts with oversized collars, drainpipe trousers as worn by Mud, and platform shoes of the type favored by Slade, Kiss, Alvin Stardust, Gary Glitter, David Bowie, and Sweet. Unisex men's and women's outfits with few differences often came together in matching sets, and popular colors included cream, burgundy, brown, and orange.

==== Informal attire ====
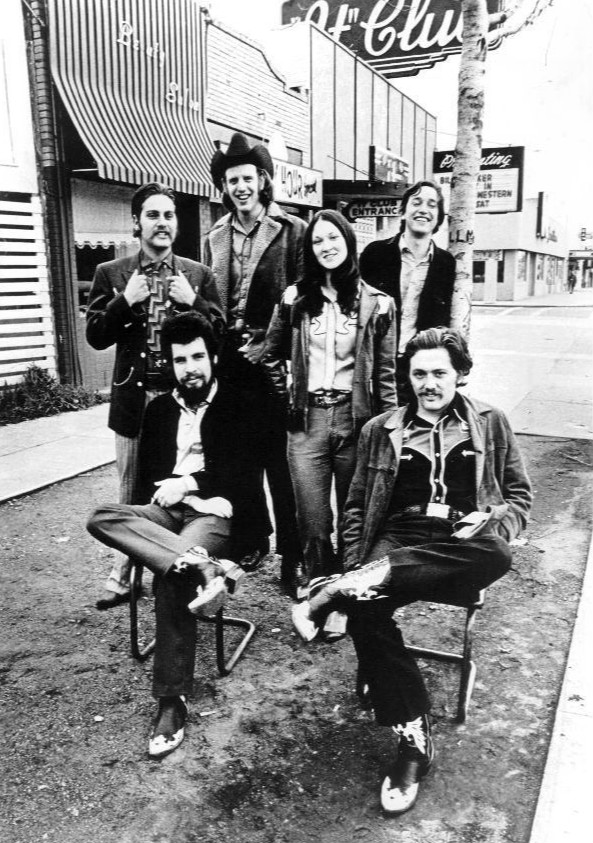
Mid-70s Western-inspired outifts worn by country music group Asleep at the Wheel.

- Fashion in the mid-1970s was generally informal and laid back for men in America. Most men simply wore jeans, sweaters, and T-shirts, which by then were being made with more elaborate designs. Men continued to wear flannel, and the leisure suit became increasingly popular from 1975 onwards, often worn with gold medallions and oxford shoes. Vintage clothing, khaki chinos, workmen's clothes, sweatshirts, leather coats, and all-denim outfits were also desired among young men. Other trends include printed shirts, zip-up cardigans, western shirts marketed to capitalise on the nostalgia for 1950s fashion, Birkenstocks, mood rings, and raincoats. Many of the printed shirts worn from circa 1972 to 1975 were in a silky nylon with a slightly glossy finish called Qiana, made in button-front styles with medium-wide collars and in a variety of prints – photographic prints, artwork prints, etc. Decades later, these Qiana shirts would be referred to as "disco shirts," but they were not called that at the time, as they were worn almost everywhere. They accompanied both casual styles like jeans and corduroys and dressier slacks and leisure suits, usually tieless and with the top couple of buttons left open.
- Around 1975, American suits started to resemble the slimmer European suit. This new model, named the quasi-European suit, featured padded shoulders, higher arm holes, a smaller waist, open patch pockets, and a small flare to the pants and jacket. In 1976, it became fashionable for men to wear velvet tuxedo jackets with more casual pants to formal events, and vests came back into vogue. It was this year that men's pants started to feature smaller flares or no flares at all. This continued into the 1980s.
- In Brezhnev's Russia, used Western clothing, especially sheepskin coats and flared trousers, became readily available due to the détente. Previously, jeans had to be imported on the black market. Politburo members continued to wear the black, grey or brown suits and fur lined overcoats of the 1960s, with grey Astrakhan caps.

==== The high-fashion Soft Look ====
- The Big Look/Soft Look that was high fashion in womenswear from 1973 to 1978 also extended to menswear, spearheaded by Giorgio Armani in 1976, who followed womenswear's lead and eliminated the lining and padding from his men's jackets, suits, and trousers, cutting them in natural fibers with enough ease that sleeves and even trouser hems could be easily rolled or pushed up and collars could be turned up. Collars, lapels, and ties were narrower, the tie, when worn, often not pulled up high but knotted low to allow for an easy, open neck. Trousers were straight-legged, sometimes even tapered, and often with soft pleats. Band-collared shirts were often worn with the look. This style was introduced to menswear during this mid-seventies period but wouldn't become widespread until 1977-78. It remained dominant in high-fashion menswear through 1978 and then menswear again followed womenswear's lead and adopted the new big-shoulder looks for 1979. The Soft Look's pushed-up jacket sleeves and turned-up collars, though, would continue into the 1980s in bigger-shouldered, more colorful form.

=== Late 1970s (1977–1979) ===
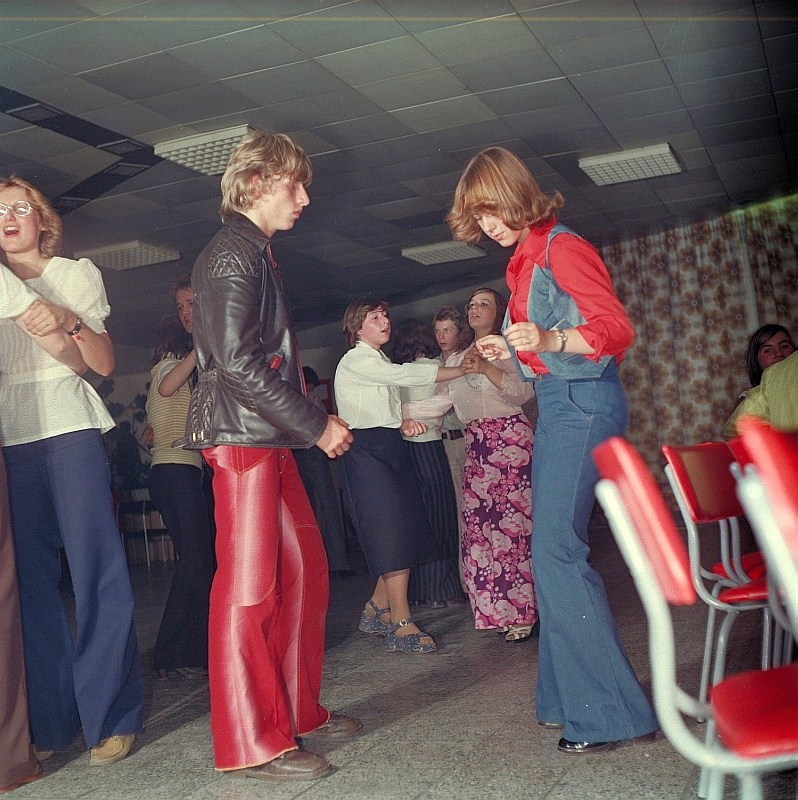
Flared jeans and trousers were popular with both sexes as can be seen at this East German disco party in 1977. In the socialist part of Germany (until 1990), the government regarded western influences on cultural life of their population very critical, but factually tolerated them in many fields.

==== Sportswear ====
- By the late 1970s, most men and women were wearing sports clothing as everyday apparel. This was primarily based on tracksuits, jumpsuits, velour or terry cloth shirts (often striped and low-cut), sweaters, cardigans, sweatshirts, puffer vests, flare jeans, straight-leg jeans, and collared shirts, both long sleeve and short sleeve. Around this time it also became fashionable for men to leave their shirts untucked. This continued into the 1980s. During the late '70s, long and popped collars became a staple part of men's fashion.
- Late 1970s accessories included low-top sneakers, tennis headbands, puka shell necklaces, and wristbands.

==== Disco style ====
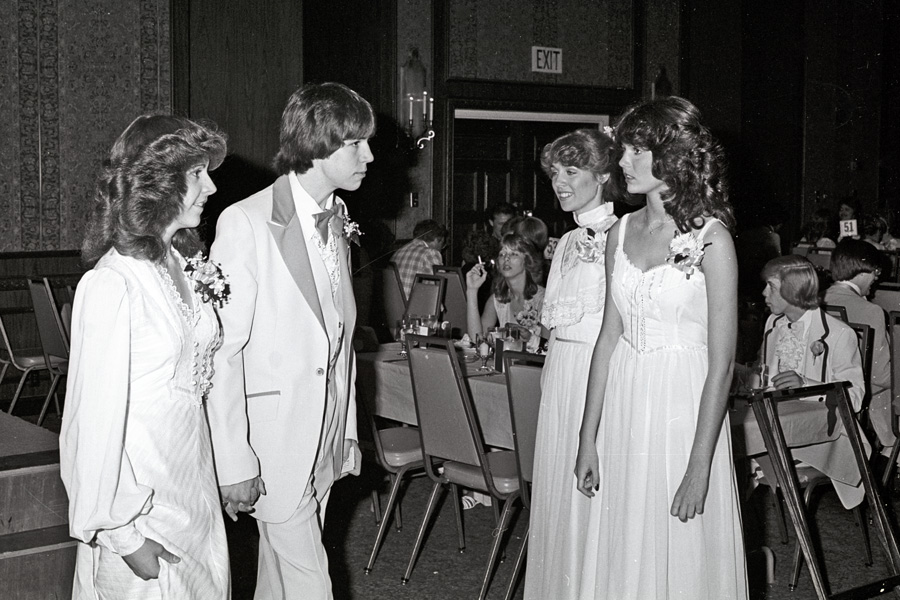
A couple at a prom in late 1970s: powder tuxedo and sleeved dress.

- From 1977 to 1979, menswear became affected by the disco style. Men began to wear three-piece suits (which became available in a variety of colours including powder blue, beige, white as worn by John Travolta in Saturday Night Fever, brown polyester, and shiny silver sharkskin) which were characterized by wide lapels, wide-legged or flared trousers, and high-rise waistcoats (US vests). Influenced by the popularity of aviator sunglasses in disco, many wore glasses in the shape of aviators but with clear prescription lenses. Neckties became wider and bolder, and shirt collars became long and pointed.

==== Big shoulders ====
- Starting with a few designers in 1978 and becoming the main trend in 1979, high-fashion menswear designers at the end of the seventies adopted the big shoulder pads that had debuted in womenswear in 1978, showing exaggeratedly padded shoulders that tapered to low closures at narrow, often ventless hips in jackets and suits, along with trousers that were straight-legged or tapered to narrow ankles. Jackets were also sometimes presented short and boxy like spencers or bellhop jackets. Unlike in womenswear, the exaggerated shoulders didn't appear in shirts but only in jackets and coats, with avant-garde designers like Thierry Mugler also presenting an occasional retro-futuristic (like something from 1950s sci-fi), outer space-looking jumpsuit with big shoulders, often marked with trapunto stitching, a style seen only on the most avant-garde. Lapels and ties for these new jacket styles were initially mostly narrow, said to help emphasize the increased shoulder width, but the most influential menswear designer of the time, Giorgio Armani, relatively quickly widened his lapels and ties – not as wide as in the early seventies, though, more like the 1940s. As the 1970s became the 1980s, both narrow and wider 1940s-width lapels and ties could be seen simultaneously. In 1979, though, these big-shouldered styles were just starting to be seen and wouldn't yet be common except among the avant-garde.

== Youth fashion ==
=== Mods ===
- During the early 1970s, the Northern soul and suedehead subcultures emerged in response to the psychedelic rock, Bohemian and hippie influences on the mainstream peacock mod subculture. Seeking a return to the music and fashions of the mid and late 1960s, members of these British subcultures wore Ben Sherman shirts, slim fit pants, tank top sweaters, turtleneck sweaters, vintage striped boating blazers, basket weave brogue shoes, black leather driving gloves, pork pie hats, Irish walking hats, and loose fitting Oxford bags for dancing. Secondhand mod clothing was also worn by many early garage punk and protopunk bands from the mid-1970s onwards, especially the Flamin Groovies and Television due to its cheapness and wide availability. The release of the cult film Quadrophenia in 1978 sparked a large scale Mod revival among a younger generation of Lambretta and Vespa scooter enthusiasts influenced by punk rock and new wave music.

=== Teddy boys ===
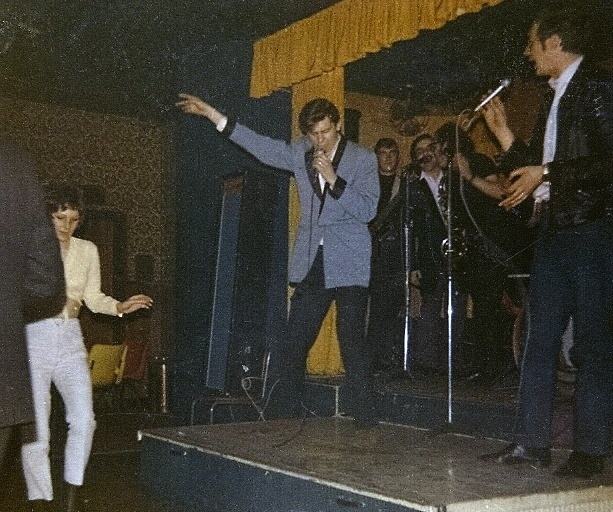
Typical mid to late 1970s Ted gear, as worn by Shakin' Stevens.

- Due to a resurgence in nostalgia for the 1950s, the Teddy boy subculture made a comeback in the UK during the early 1970s. A similar rockabilly subculture known as Raggare underwent a revival in Sweden and Germany at the same time. Brothel creepers, drainpipe trousers, bolo ties and drape jackets were popular, typically with contrasting velvet collars and cuffs. Influenced by glam rock bands like Showaddywaddy, the Teds of the 1970s wore bright colors like electric blue, leopardskin or brocade waistcoats, and styled their hair with hair spray rather than brylcreem. In the late 1970s the Teds became the arch enemies of the punk subculture and Mod revivalists.

=== Hippies ===
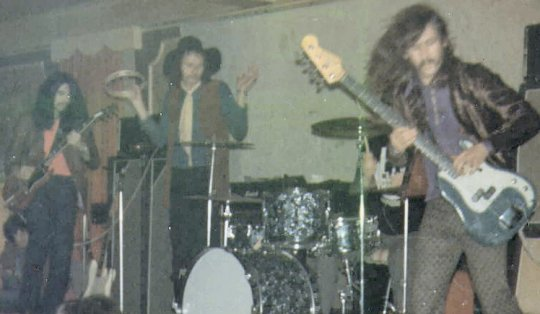
British rock band Killing Floor, 1971.

- One of the most ubiquitous subcultures of the early and mid-1970s were the hippies. Typically middle class youths from Britain, America and New Zealand, these practitioners of free love favored a unisex look with long hair, tie dye and flower power motifs, Bob Dylan caps, kurtas, hemp waistcoats, baja jackets, bell bottoms, sandals, and maxi skirts for the girls. Due to the United States' active involvement in the Vietnam War from 1955 to 1975, American teenagers wanted to make an antiwar counterculture statement through the way they dressed. Old military uniforms and washed off navy bell-bottoms were commonly purchased from secondhand stores, and then embellished with floral embroideries and brightly colored peace symbol patches at home. In reaction to the conservative ivy league fashions favored by their parents, American hippies of both sexes rejected designer brands in favor of a unisex style, often making use of corduroy, hemp, and vintage clothing from charity shops. Although glam rock had largely supplanted the hippie movement in urban areas during the mid to late 70s, offshoots such as the New Age travellers, Freak scene, Nambassa housetruckers and surfers continued until the 1990s.

=== Heavy metal ===
- During the early and mid-1970s, members of the hard rock and heavy metal subculture favored typical hippie fashions like earth tones, tie dye T-shirts, and flared trousers of the type worn on stage by Jethro Tull or Led Zeppelin. This changed later in the decade, when many fans of Judas Priest, AC/DC and Meat Loaf began imitating the clothing of greasers, outlaw bikers, punk rockers and leathermen due to the association of such fashions with toughness. Typical heavy metal fashions in the UK, US and Australia included faded jeans, leather battle jackets, combat boots, studded belts, black leather jackets like the Schott Perfecto, and iron crosses frequently pilfered from their father's war souvenirs. Beards, moustaches and shoulder length hair were popular among men, while female metal fans sometimes imitated the brightly dyed, teased and backcombed punk hair of the late 1970s.

=== Black power ===
- Urban African American youths frequently imitated the paramilitary uniforms of the Fruit of Islam, anti-colonialist African insurgents, and early 1970s black power groups like the Black Panthers. The Panthers' French counterparts called themselves the Del Vikings and Black Dragons, listened to rockabilly and punk rock, and fought against neonazi skinheads during the late 70s and early 80s.
- Typical clothing included black leather jackets, vests, black driving gloves, leather peaked caps embellished with chains and metal studs, African folk costume like the fez or dashiki, traditional African colors like black, red, yellow or green, Ancient Egyptian jewelry such as the Ankh, gold chains, and railroad stripe pants for women. Due to the poverty in the ghetto, black children often wore secondhand clothing that was too big or too small, inspiring the baggy pants worn as hip-hop fashion during the 1980s and 1990s. In the UK, US and Jamaica Afro hair and dreadlocks became popular from 1972 to 1976 among Motown, soul music and reggae fans, as a rejection of the straightened hairstyles associated with white culture.

=== Cholos ===
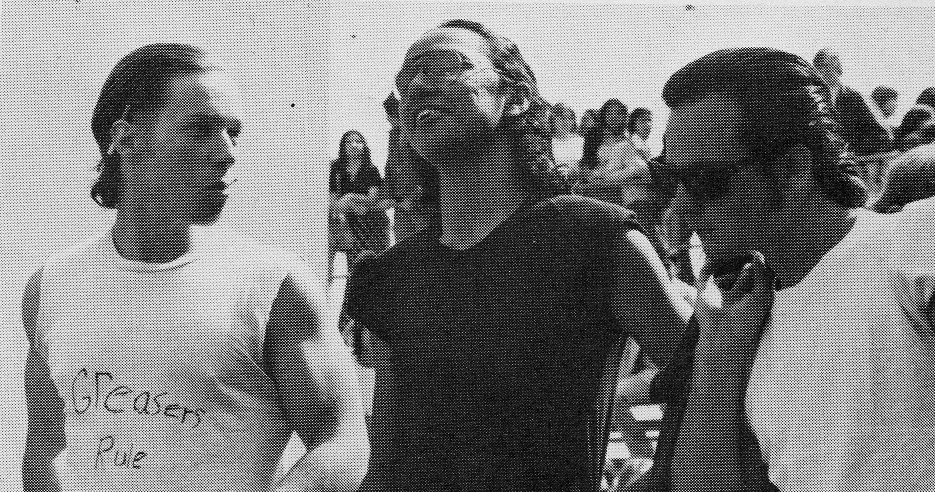
Three Los Angeles Chicanos in 1974.

- Following the recession of 1973, the zoot suited pachuco look declined due to its association with comedic Blaxploitation pimps. Instead, working class Mexican youths began dressing in a more casual style inspired by the clothing of prison gangs, left wing counterculture groups like the Brown berets, the antiwar movement, and the 1960s greaser subculture. White T-shirts, winklepickers, double denim "Texan tuxedos," ringer Tees, plaid shirts, Aviators, black wool tuques, brown berets, green military surplus field jackets, sheepskin coats, Castro hats, untucked white shirts, and khaki Dickies pants were commonly worn by these cholos and chicanos, together with slicked-back pompadour hairstyles and large sideburns.

=== Punks ===
- Punk rock was a musical genre that greatly influenced fashion in the late 1970s. A great deal of punk fashion from the 1970s was based on the designs of Vivienne Westwood and her partner Malcolm McLaren, McLaren opened a stall at the back of vintage American clothing store, which taken over 430 King's Road and called it 'Let it Rock'. By 1974, 430 had renamed the store, which became famous as 'SEX'. McLaren described SEX as 'a haven phenomenon known as punk rock.' Punk emerged in London, and spread into the United States. A complex amalgam of various stylistic influences, Punk had its roots in the streets of London and the music scene of New York. Street punk fashion generally consisted of ripped clothes, black turtlenecks, drainpipe jeans, tight leather pants, leather jackets (often embellished with chains, spikes, studs, and paint), jackets and shirts with taboo images or messages, dog collars, safety pins, kilts, and Doc Martens. A tamer, less threatening version of the Punk style called "New Wave", which featured jagged hems on clothing and more elaborate embroidery went mainstream in the early 1980s.

== Hairstyles ==
=== Women's hairstyles ===
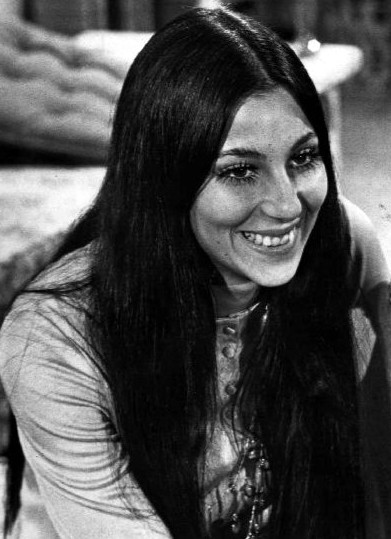
Singer Cher in 1971. In the 1970s, women's hair was usually worn long with a centre parting

Throughout much of the decade, women and teenage girls wore their hair long, with a centre or side parting. Harper's Bazaar's Lindy Segal attributed the popularity of long, straight hairstyles in the 1970s to Cher, whose distinctive look became associated with what is now sometimes referred to as "Cher hair". Other hairstyles of the early to mid-1970s included the wavy "gypsy" cut, the layered shag, and the "flicked" style, popularly referred to as "wings", in which the hair was flicked into resembling small wings at the temples. This look was popularised by the stars of the television series Charlie's Angels. Blonde-streaked or "frosted" hair was also popular. In 1977, punk singer Debbie Harry of Blondie sparked a new trend with her shoulder-length, dyed platinum blonde hair worn with a long fringe (bangs), popular in the late 1970s.

For black people in the United States and elsewhere, the afro was worn by both sexes throughout the decade. As the Afro entered the mainstream, Afro-enhancing products and Afro wigs emerged in the African-American beauty industry. These wigs were created and advertised as a bolder look that could conveniently be removed and put on for a night out. For Black women, it became a staple in disco, with disco divas like Diana Ross and Gloria Gaynor adopting it in the 1970s. Afros were also occasionally sported by Whites, especially Jewish Americans as an alternative to the uniform long, straight hair which was a fashion mainstay until the arrival of punk and the "disco look" when hair became shorter and centre partings were no longer the mode.

Among the most iconic women's hairstyle of the 1970s is the Farrah Fawcett hairstyle. Popularized in 1976, the hairstyle was heavily imitated by many American women and girls. It incorporated waves, curls, and layers. The style mostly worn with bangs, but could also be worn with a side part. To make it even more stylish, women and girls would frost their hair with blonde streaks.

By the late 1970s, the popularity of braided hairstyles for Afro-textured hair, such as cornrows, increased. These looks are exemplified by vocal group Sister Sledge on their 1979 He's the Greatest Dancer album cover.

=== Men's hairstyles ===
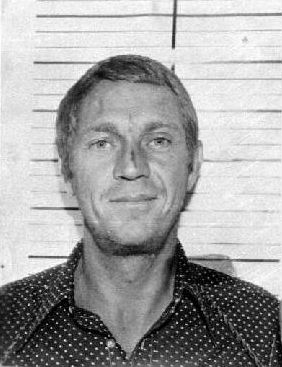
Steve McQueen with sideburns, 1972.

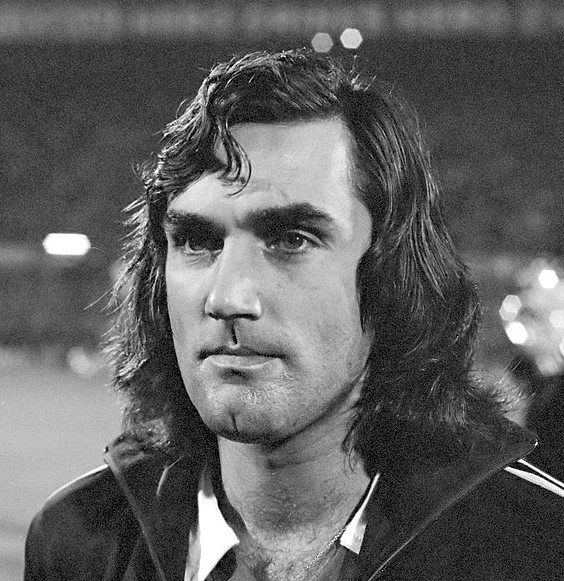
Footballer George Best wore long hair in 1976.

Continuing on from the 1960s, the ducktail and Pompadour hairstyle (then known as the "Elvis Presley hairstyle") were popular among young Italian-American and Mexican-American men in big cities like New York. Large quantities of grease or brylcreem was normally used to keep the hair in place. The early and mid-1970s generally featured longer hair on men, as way of rebelling against the social norms of years past. Sideburns were also worn around the same time. Some of the most popular hairstyles for men include "Long and Luscious" hairstyle, mod haircut, and the "buzzcut" hairstyle popularised by action heroes like Steve McQueen. In the late 1970s, men went for the chop, ranging from crew cuts, to buzz cuts, to a shag. This was mainly done for an athletic look, and sideburns and facial hair went out of style.

The afro, if able to be grown, was often a quintessential part of a man's disco club or roller disco ensemble. As popular male hairstyles increased in length in the late 1960s, so too did hair within the male African-American community, thereby the early 1970s saw an expansion in the overall size of afros. Examples of male celebrities with afros included Maurice White of Earth, Wind, & Fire, Jimi Hendrix, and male members of the Jackson 5. As popular interest in disco music increased, the afro became more of a mainstream look; however, its adoption by people of non-African descent caused the afro to lose its radical political edge (having been previously associated with the Black Panthers during the 1960s).

Additionally, as with women, the 1970s saw an increase in the popularity of men's braided hairstyles such as cornrows, exemplified by disco-pop musician Rick James.

== Makeup and cosmetics ==
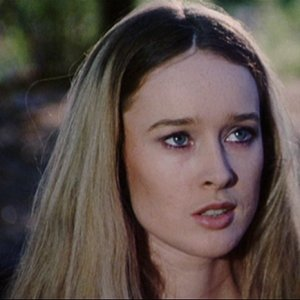
Actress Camille Keaton in 1972. Throughout most of the decade, women preferred light, natural-looking make-up for the daytime.

Cosmetics in the 1970s reflected the contradictory roles ascribed for the modern woman. For the first time since 1900, make-up was chosen situationally, rather than in response to monolithic trends. The era's two primary visions were the daytime "natural look" presented by American designers and Cosmopolitan magazine, and the evening aesthetic of sexualized glamour presented by European designers and fashion photographers. In the periphery, punk and glam were also influential. The struggling cosmetics industry attempted to make a comeback, using new marketing and manufacturing practices.

== Image gallery ==
Images representing the fashion trends of the 1970s.

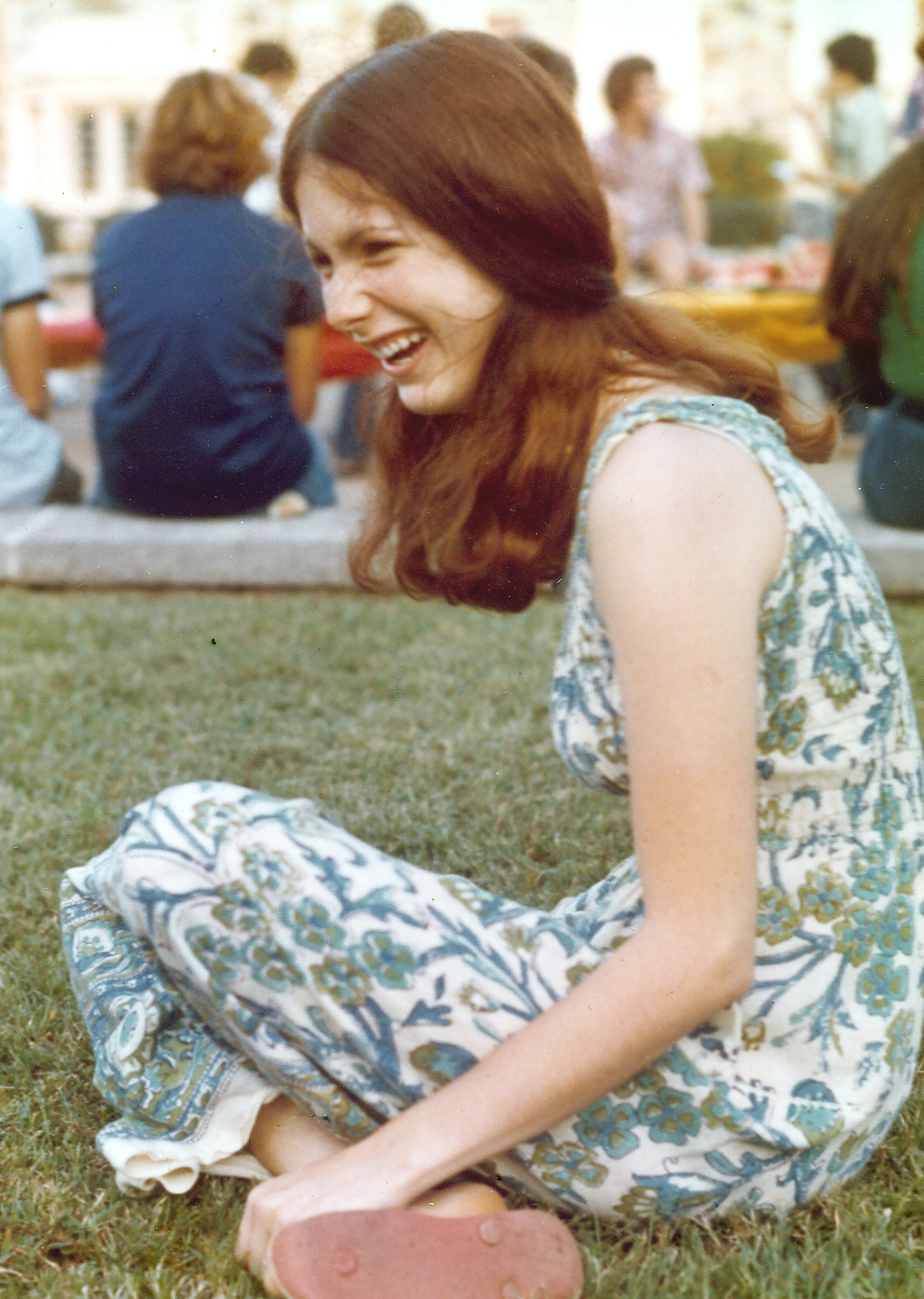
The early 1970s' fashions were a continuation of the hippie look from the late 1960s.

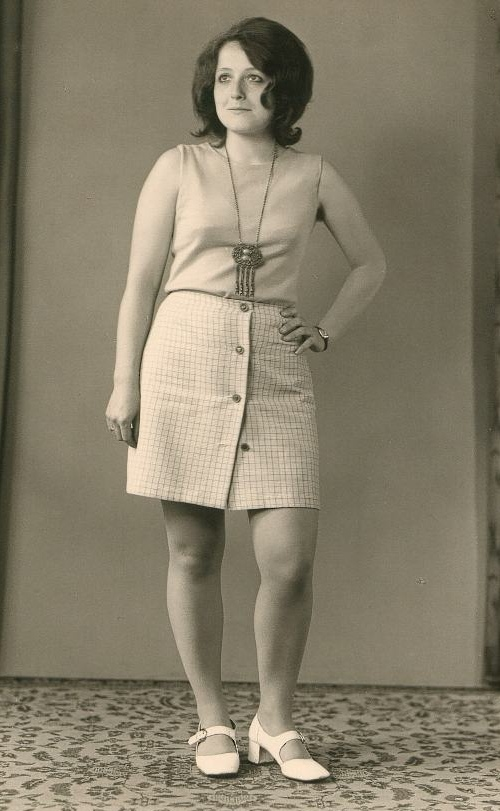
Woman in miniskirt, 1970

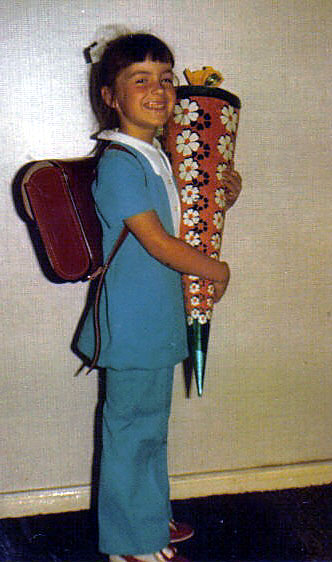
A West German schoolgirl with Schultüte in 1970, with a 'hippyish' outfit on.

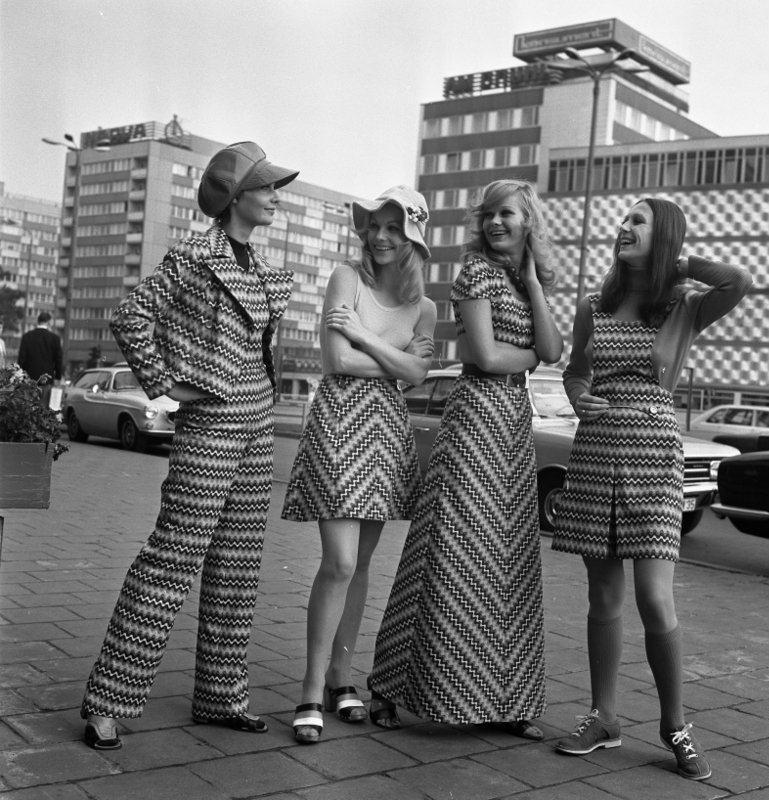
Fashion models in Leipzig, GDR, 1972. One of the women is modelling a "maxi" dress.

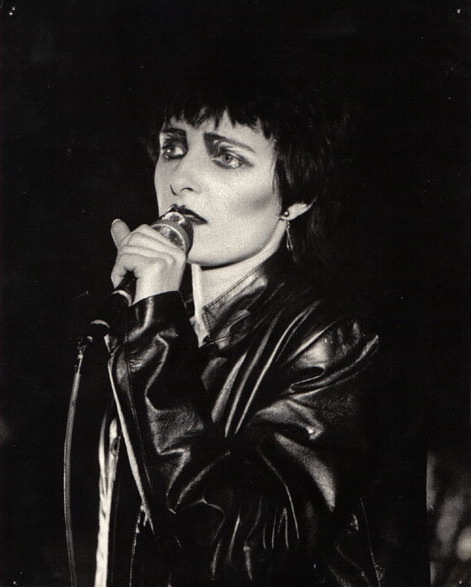
Siouxsie Sioux of the English punk group Siouxsie and the Banshees.

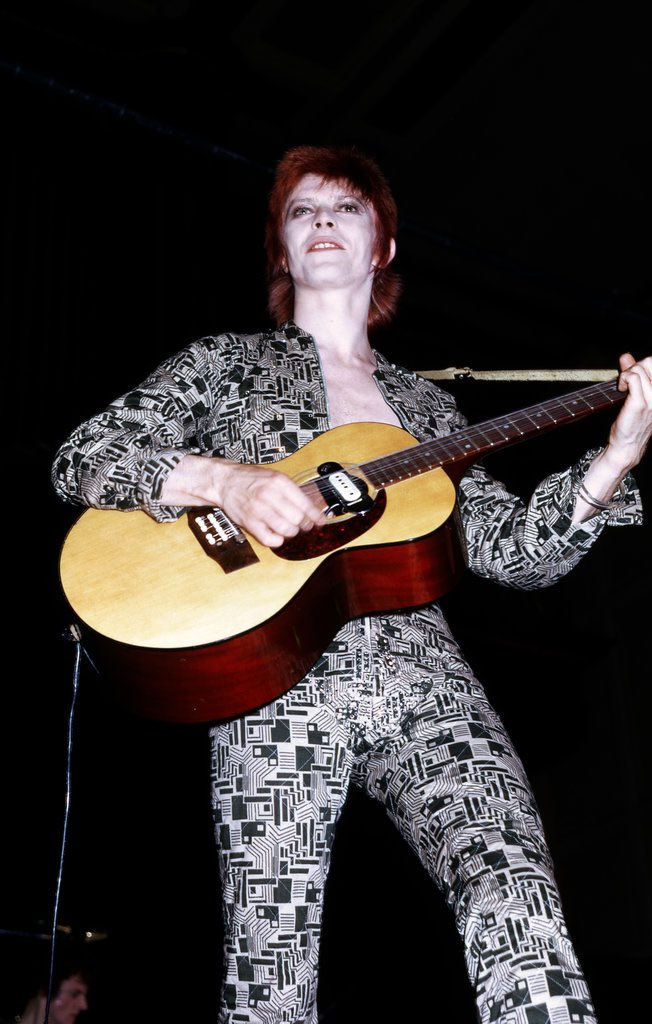
David Bowie in the early 1970s.

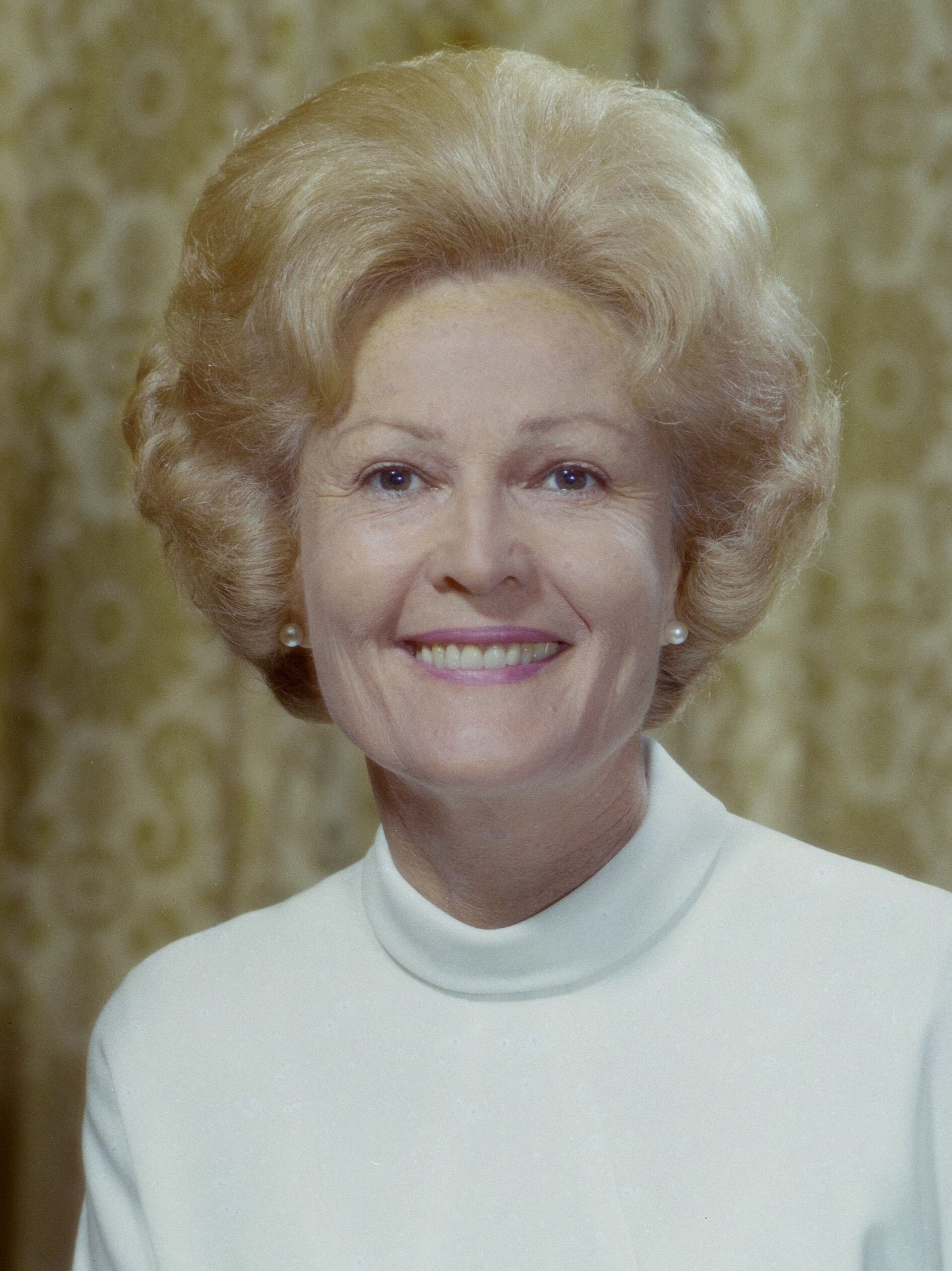
American First Lady Pat Nixon wears a white dress that was popular until the final years of the decade.

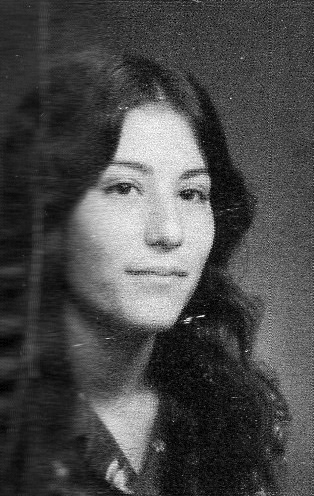
Girl in 1973 with a "flicked" hairstyle.

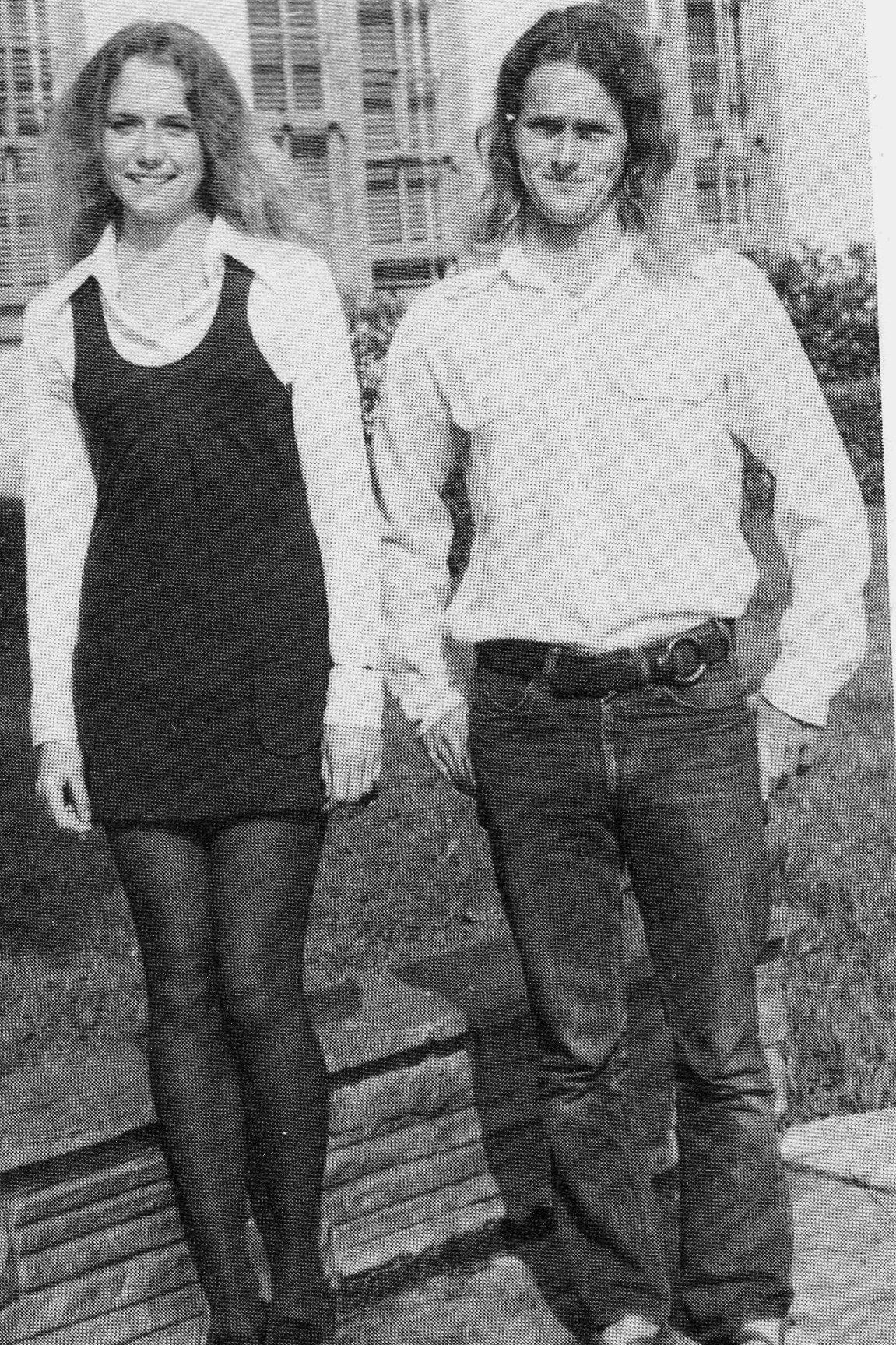
Los Angeles high school students, 1973. The tousled, blond surfer hair was popular for young men in southern California.

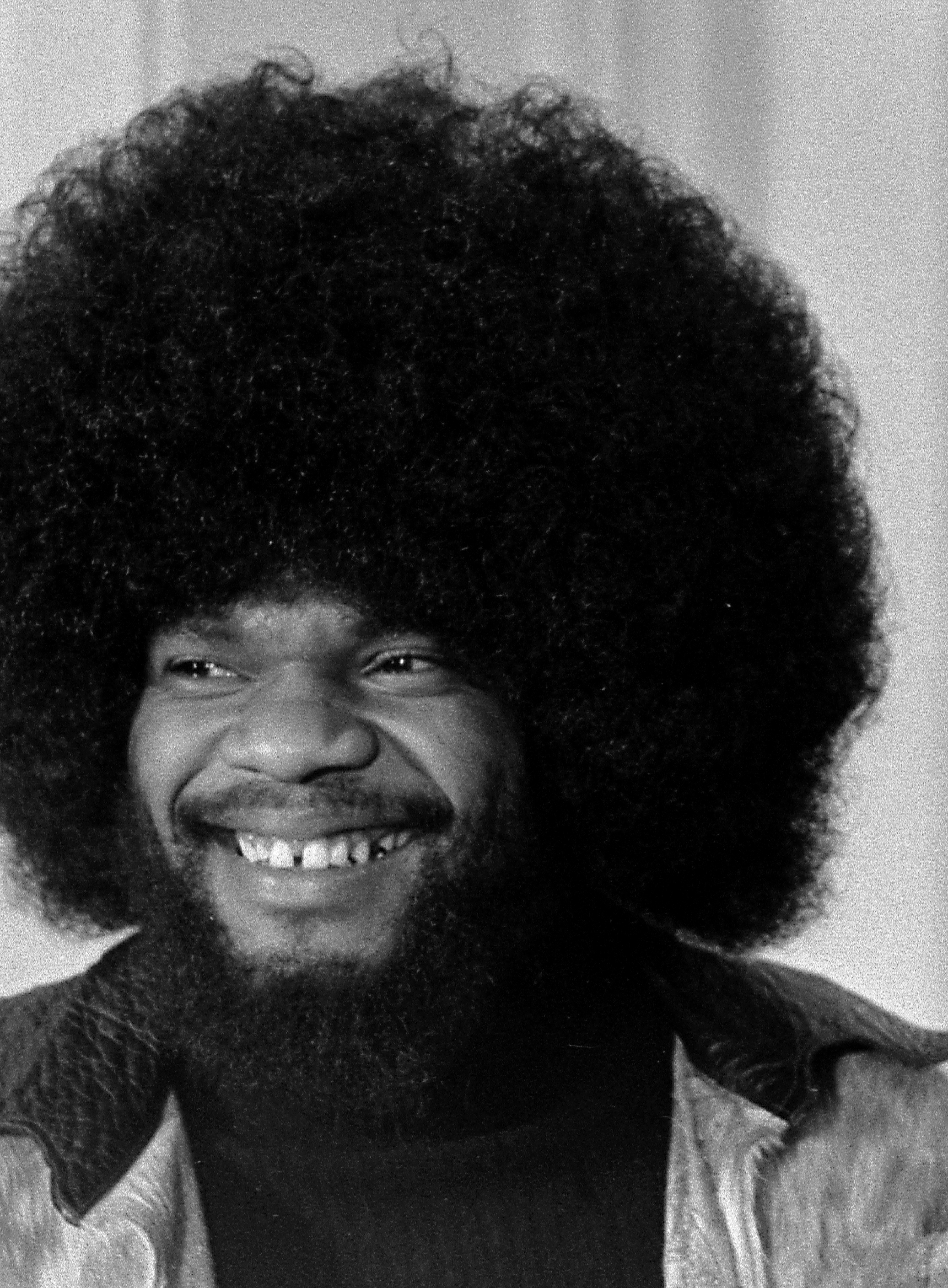
Singer Billy Preston in 1974 wearing an Afro hairstyle.

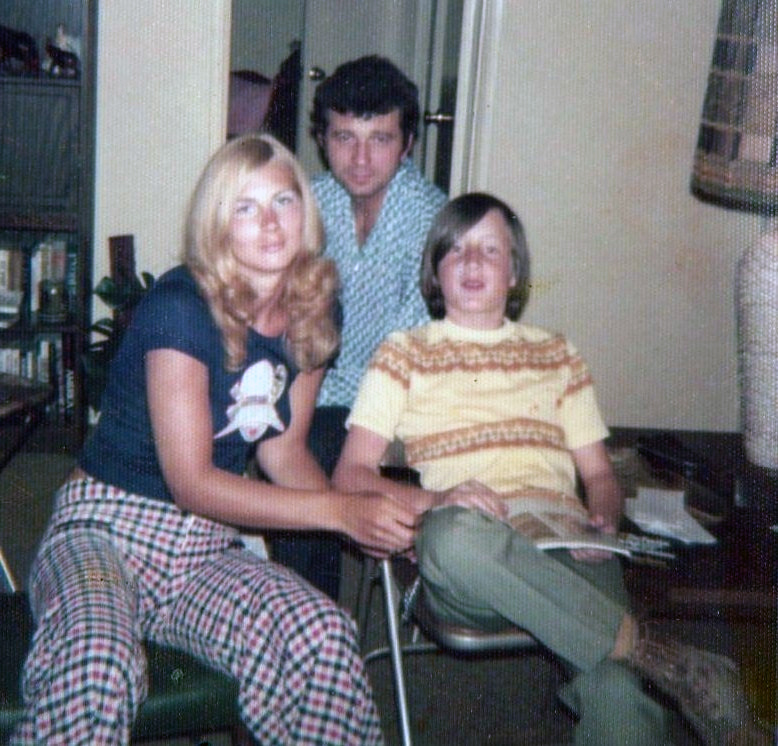
American casual attire, 1974.

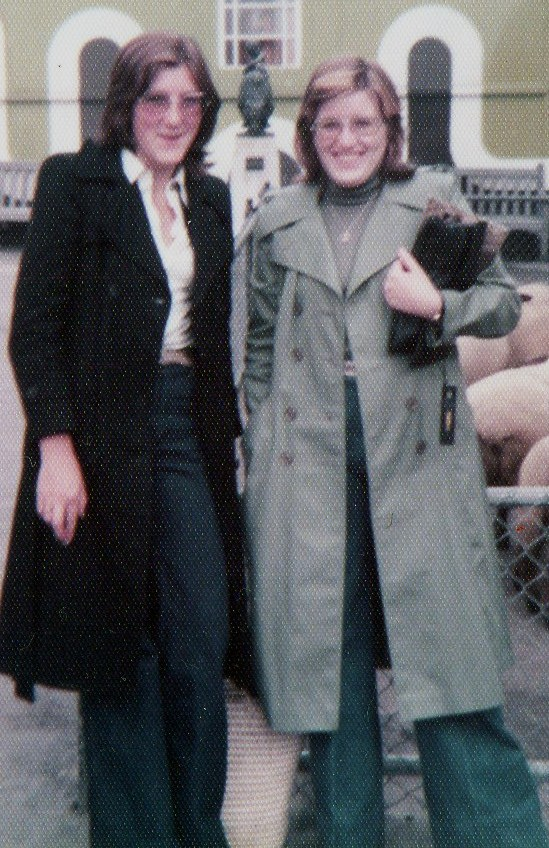
British girls in 1975 in flared jeans

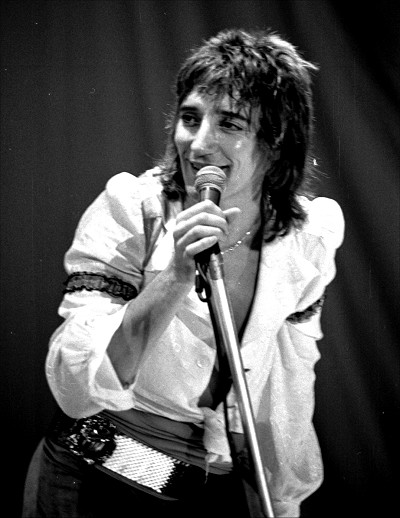
British singer Rod Stewart, 1976.

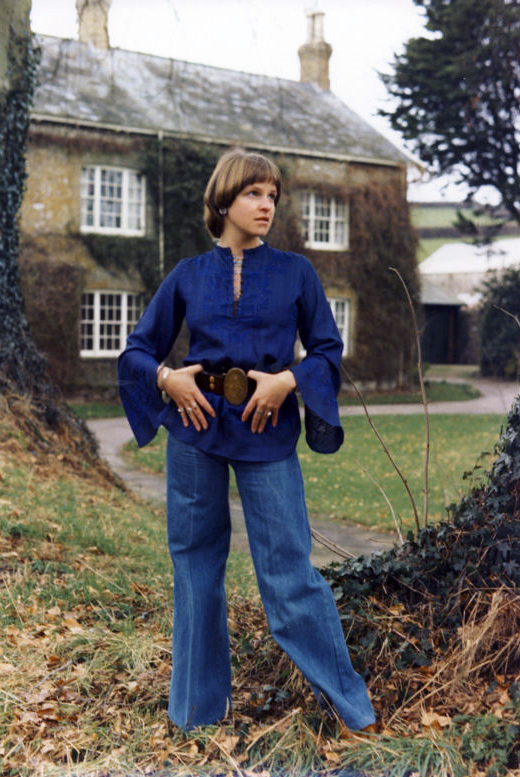
English girl in the mid-1970s wearing a wide-sleeved shirt, belted at the waist.

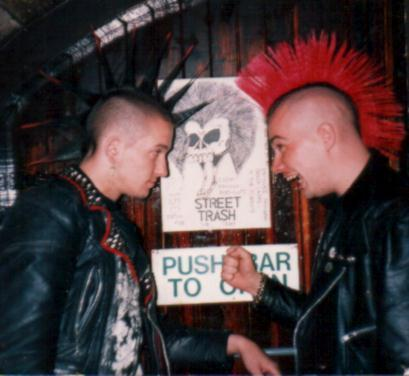
Two punks from the late 1970s

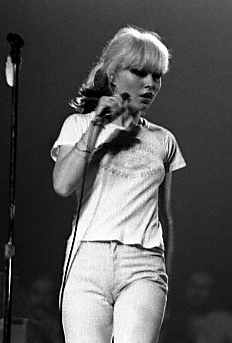
Debbie Harry of Blondie in 1977.

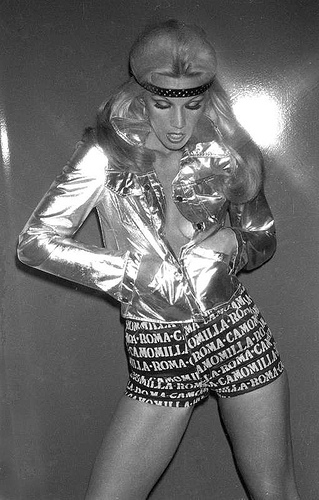
Susana Giménez wearing hotpants, 1977

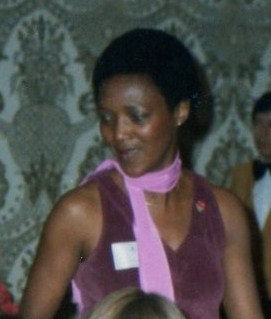
Silk scarves were popular fashion accessories for women in the 1970s.

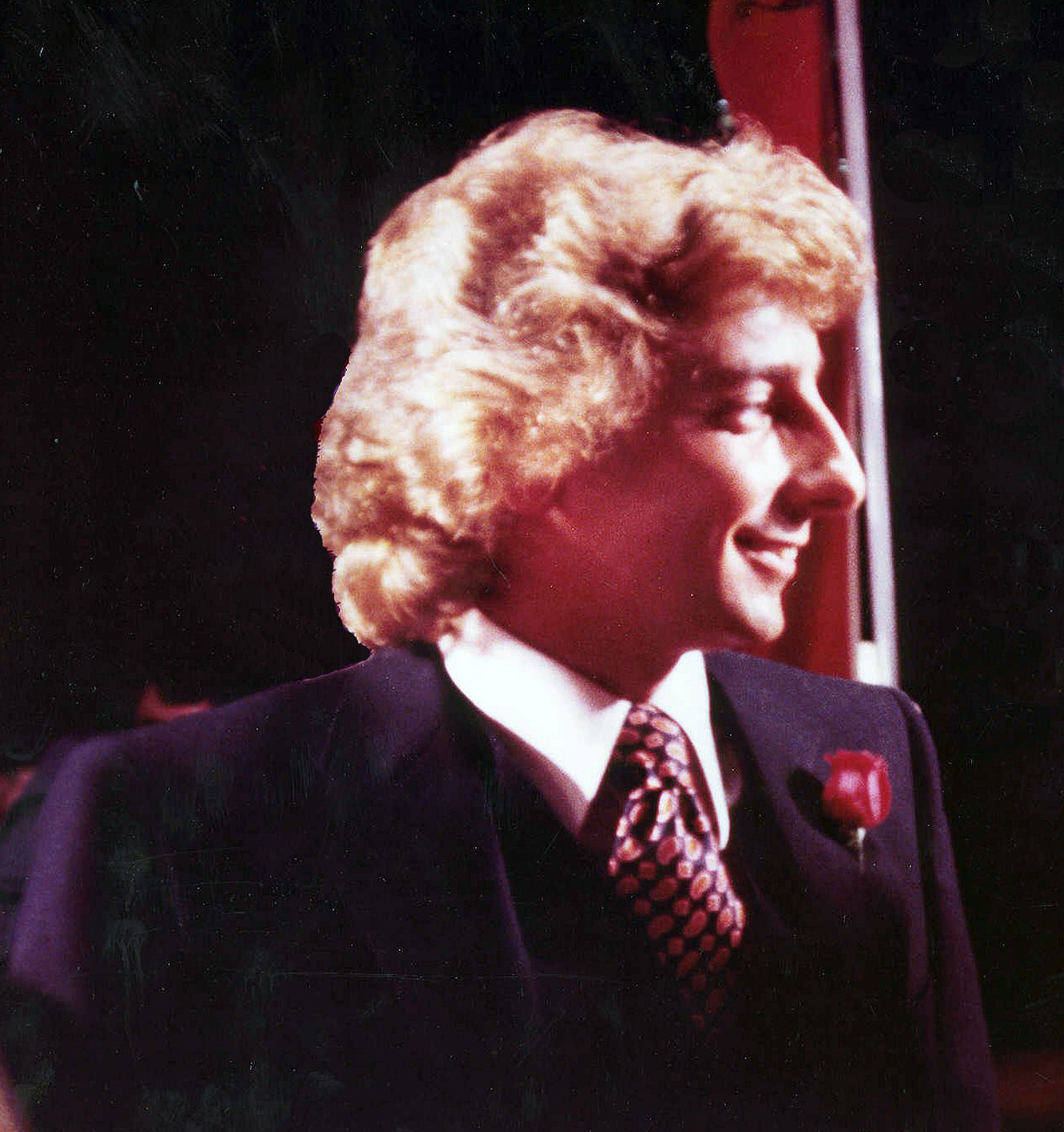
Singer Barry Manilow wears his hair longish in the soft, layered style favoured by men in the 1970s.

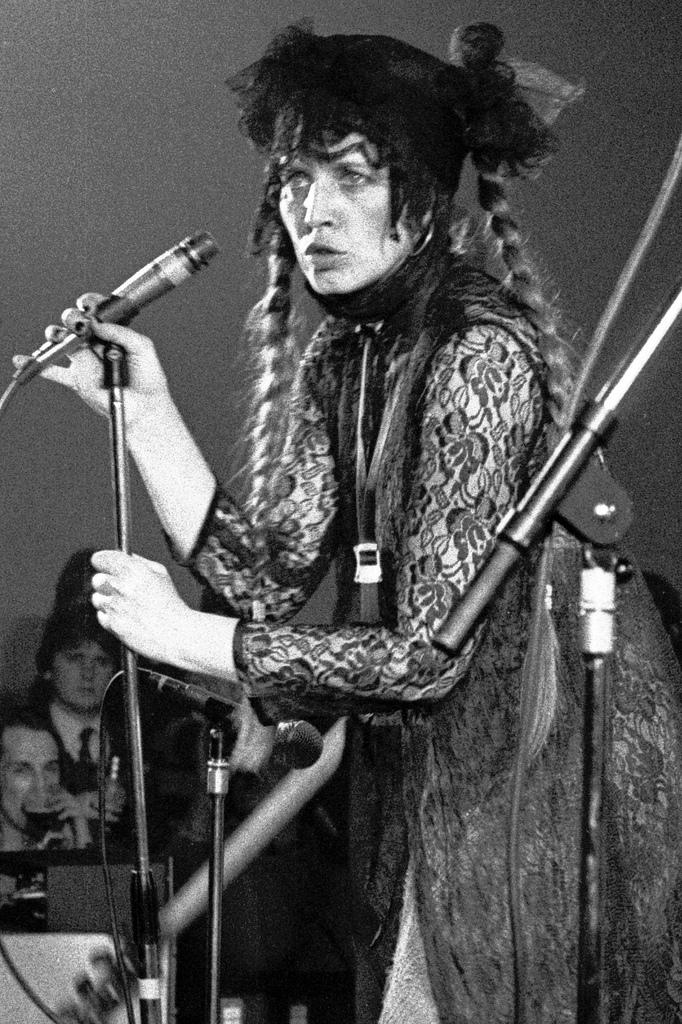
Punk pioneer Lene Lovich in 1979, with her trademark long plaited hair.

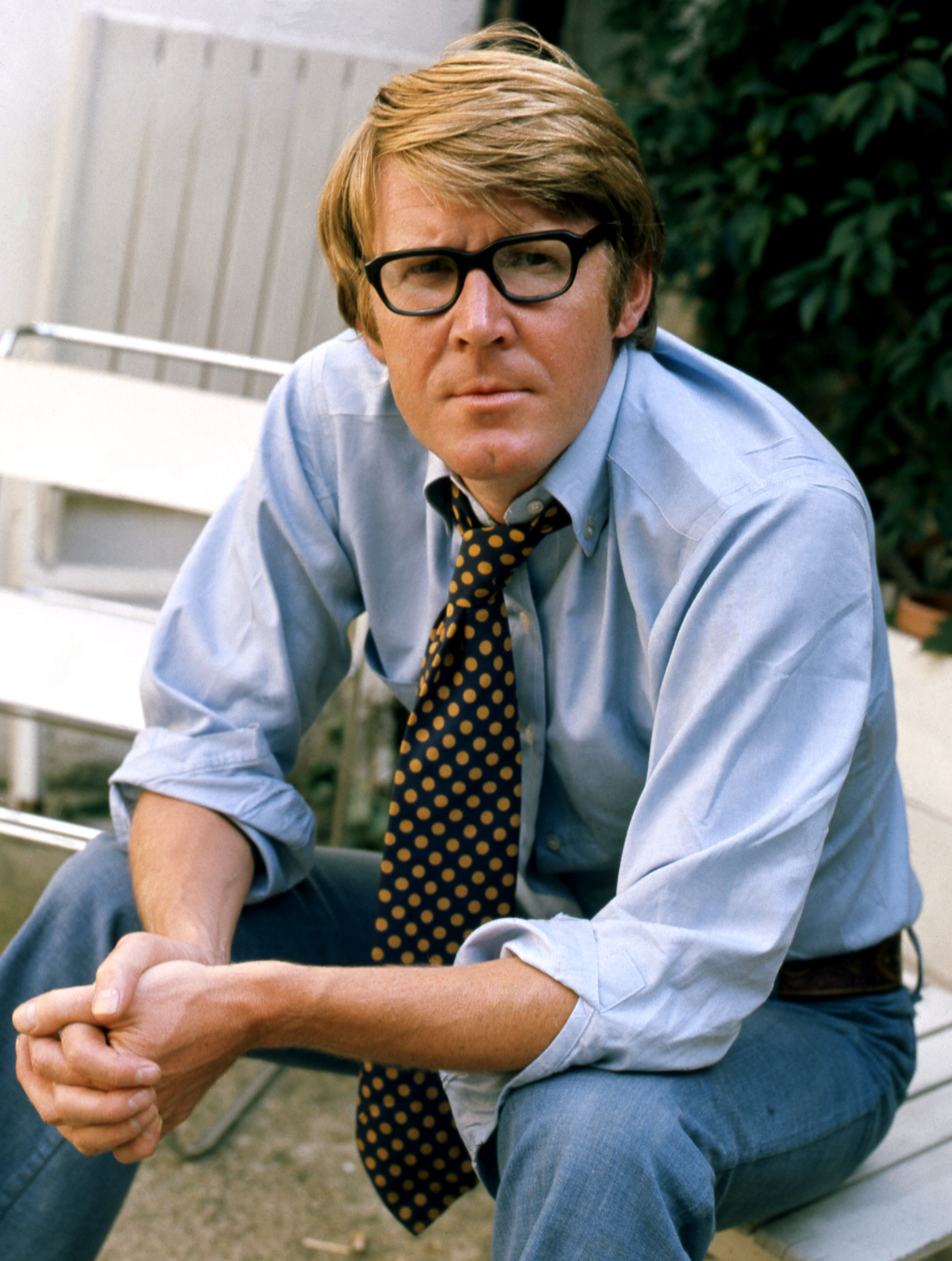
Alan Bennett in 1973, wearing a wide necktie

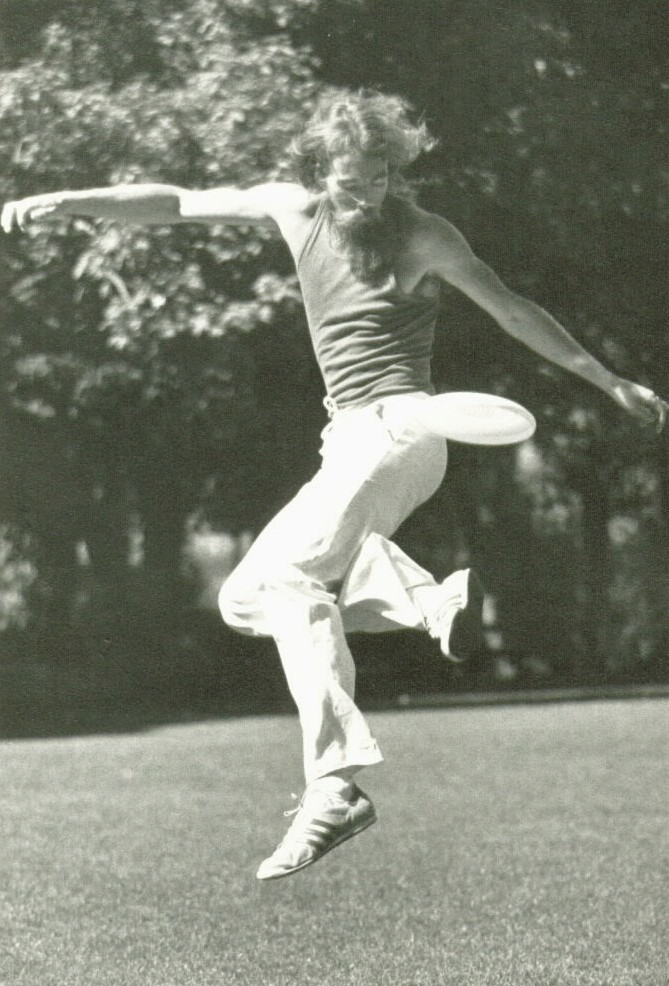
Frisbee player Ken Westerfield wearing drawstring bell bottoms in the late 1970s

== See also ==
- 1980s in fashion
- 1990s in fashion
- 2000s in fashion
- Deconstruction (fashion)
