= Thrift store chic =

Styles of dress where clothes are cheap and/or used

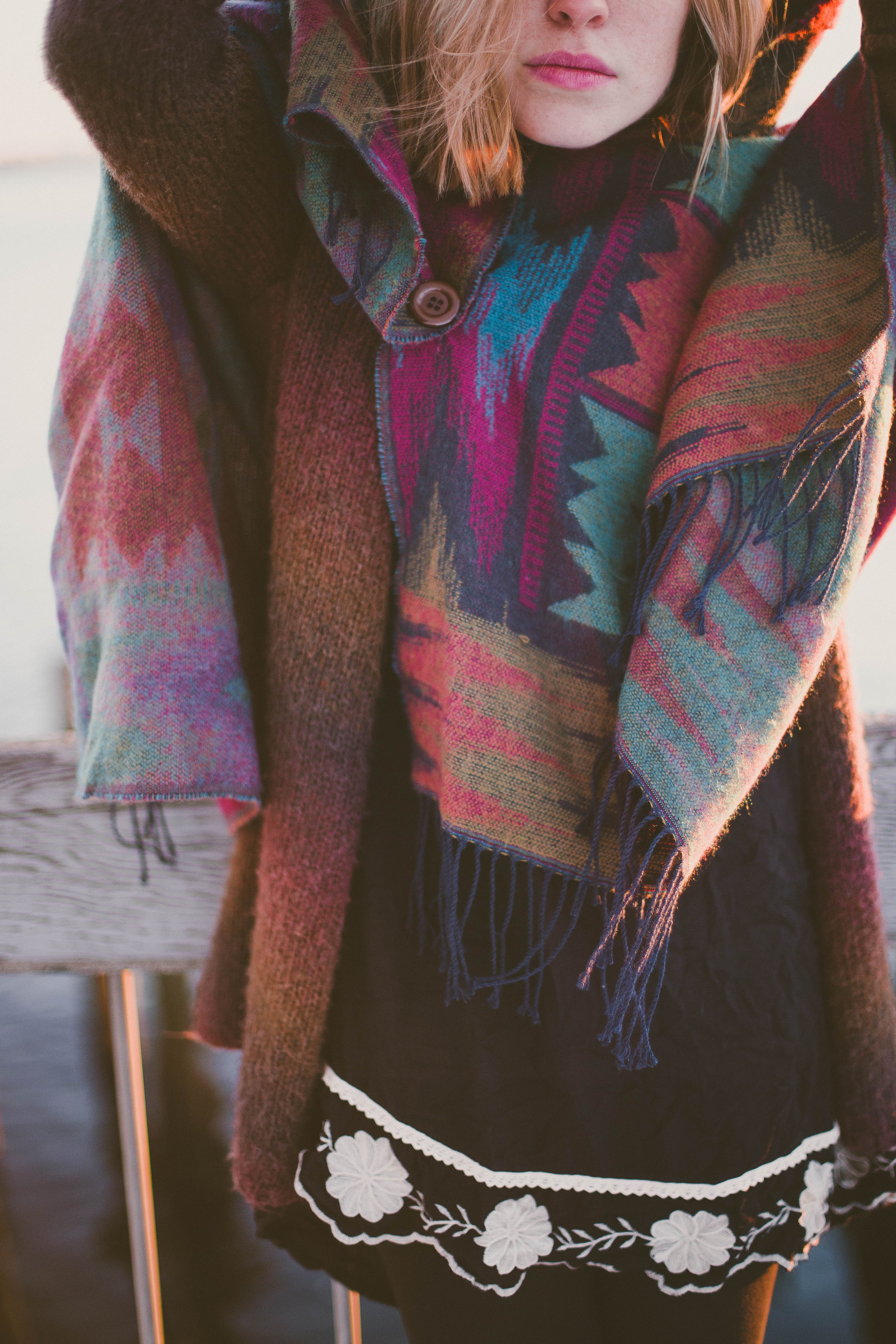
An example of a thrift store outfit.

Thrift store chic refers to a style of dressing where clothes are cheap and/or used. Clothes are often purchased from thrift stores such as the Salvation Army, Goodwill, or Value Village. Originally popular among the hippies of the 1960s, this fashion movement resurfaced during the mid-1980s among teenagers, and expanded into the 1990s with the growing popularity of such music and style influences including the grunge band Nirvana. Thrift store chic can be considered an anti-fashion statement because it does not follow fashion trends and does not attempt to look expensive or new.

Thrift store chic is often composed with vintage T-shirts (striped tees and anything with vintage graphics, in particular), sweaters, flannel 'lumberjack' shirts, and worn and torn jeans. This laid-back, nonchalant, and aloof look became fashionable and trendy without attempting to. Originally worn for a variety of reasons, which include an homage, or attempt to resurrect earlier styles, or even in protest to child labour and exploitation in sweatshops. By the late 2000s, many of the younger indie kids wore thrift store clothes primarily for their ironic anti-fashion connotations.

== History ==
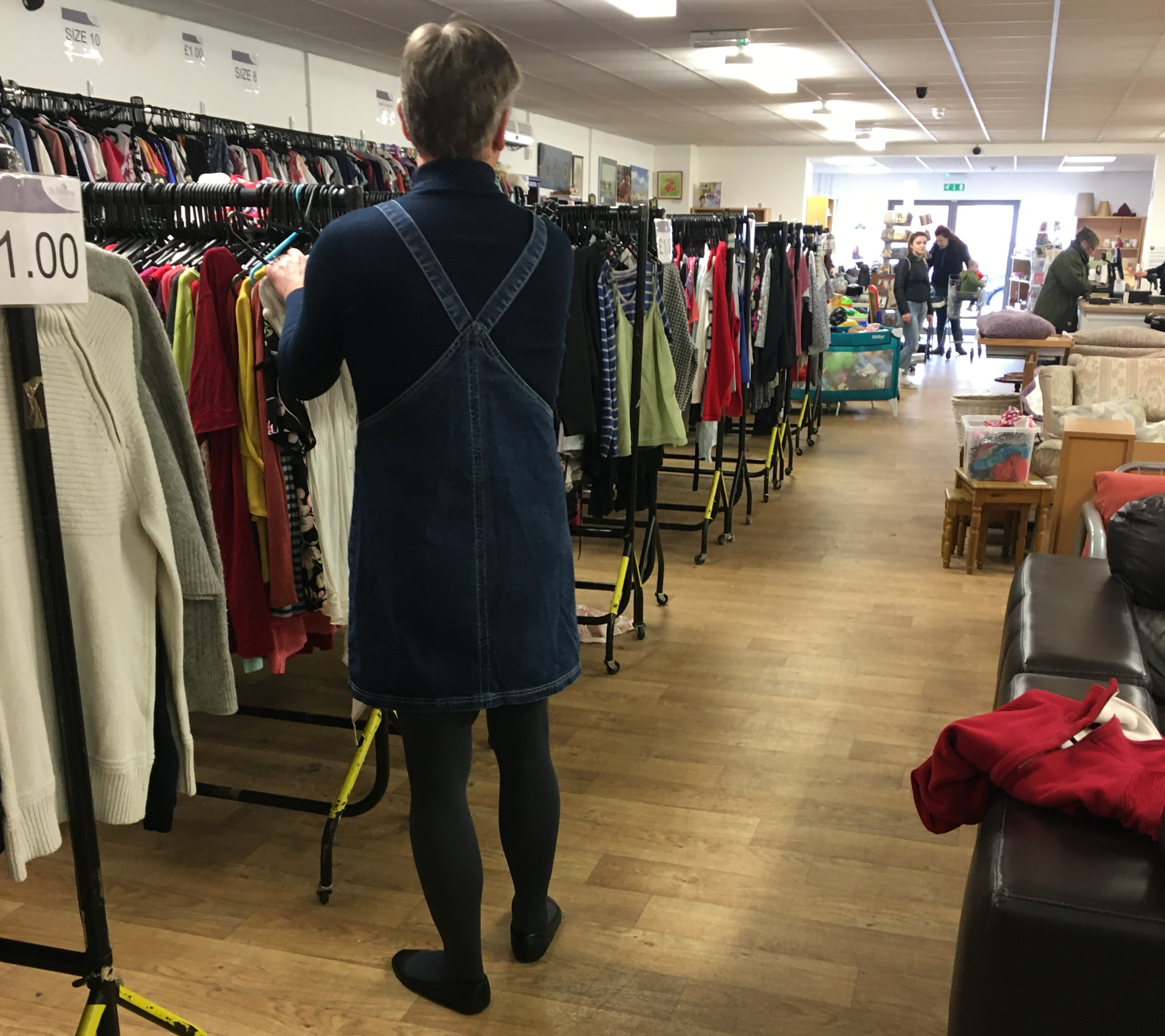
Clothing in a charity shop.

In the 1990s, singers such as Kurt Cobain, Courtney Love, and Eddie Vedder promoted the look. Kurt Cobain's style included uncoordinated and non-brand-name items of clothing that created the look of a carelessly cool grunge rock star. Clothes often had holes or tears in them and were worn in many layers, which hid the body. Cobain's modest style contrasted with the aggressive and glamorous style of bands such as Guns N' Roses. Fans of Nirvana found it easy to emulate his style, thus identifying themselves and the grunge movement. His thrift store style also reflected an ironic stance against corporate culture.

Entering the 2000s, this look became associated with musical scenes including indie rock and emo, gradually spreading to the hipster movement. The hipster movement is popular among people in their 20s and 30s whose style attempts to reject mainstream trends. The hipster movement embraced thrift store chic because of its love for vintage items, especially clothing. Items that became popular for indie girls included flowery cotton dresses, cardigans, keffiyehs, and eyeglasses chosen deliberately for their unfashionable connotations. Hipster-thrift-store-chic embraces nostalgia and irony by combining old trucker-caps and vintage bowling t-shirts with worn luxury goods like leather jackets, old military dress uniforms as a protest against the war in Iraq, or used business wear, such as tweed cloth sportcoats.

With the stock market crash of 2008, shopping at thrift stores became more widely accepted. Bragging about how much an item of clothing cost was no longer about how expensive it was, but rather how cheap it was. Showing off expensive clothing when people were losing their jobs was no longer tactful. In the United States, resale stores experienced an average of 35% increase in sales. Purchasing used clothing has also lost much of its stigma due to the growing environmental movement towards consumption.

In 2013, the Macklemore and Lewis's single "Thrift Shop" reached number 1 on the U.S. Billboard Hot 100 chart. The song glorifies shopping at thrift shops and denounces expensive brands, such as Gucci, as "getting tricked by a business."

In the 2020s, thrift store fashion experienced another surge in popularity, particularly among young people. Members of Generation Z have contributed to the rise of secondhand shopping through popular social media platforms like TikTok and Instagram, where users share short videos of their thrift hauls, styling tips, and secondhand shopping advice.

== Economic and cultural impact ==
The increasing popularity of thrift store fashion has led to some criticism. Some researchers and journalists have noted that rising demand for secondhand clothing has driven up prices at local thrift stores, making once-affordable clothing less accessible to low-income communities.

At the same time, advocates argue that thrift shopping reduces textile waste and promotes more sustainable consumption patterns, aligning with current movements in sustainable fashion.

== Social media ==
Multiple social media platforms have content covering thrift culture. YouTube thrift store hauls have helped increase the popularity of thrift shopping. A notable YouTuber who has contributed significantly to thrifting's rise in popularity is Emma Chamberlain. Emma Chamberlain has multiple videos on her channel where she not only visits multiple thrift store locations, but she interacts with her viewers by breaking the fourth wall and sharing her style.

The rise in thrift stores' popularity and presence on social media was most notably seen after 2015 on websites such as Twitter, Pinterest, and YouTube. On the social media platform TikTok, users not only share thrifting tips, style, and "lucky scores," but they often use the term "scavenger hunt" to describe the ordeal. Thrifting has been popularized to the point where individuals sometimes use the term "thrifting" as a verb to describe their thrift store shopping trip.

The use of social media has allowed resellers to buy clothing from thrift stores and resell them on online platforms and social media sites, which is known as reselling. Some established thrift stores have also moved to selling their products on online platforms, such as eBay. Some of these thrift stores include select locations of larger branches or companies.

The growth of online resale platforms has expanded access to secondhand fashion. Apps such as Depop and Poshmark allow users to buy and sell used clothing, contributing to a rapidly growing resale market. The secondhand apparel market is projected to grow significantly faster than the traditional retail market in the coming years.

== Upcycling ==
Thrift store chic is also popular among people who enjoy creating their own outfits from pieces of used clothing. This DIY (do-it-yourself) approach creates original articles of clothing that can be very personalized. For example, in the 1986 movie Pretty in Pink, Molly Ringwald's character, Andie Walsh, is fond of taking clothing from thrift stores and creating a unique and eclectic wardrobe. For instance, the prom dress she creates is made from merging two separate dresses.

A study conducted at the University of Akron, set out to find whether altering and upcycling clothes from a thrift store would make them more appealing to consumers. Their survey results showed 38% of participants reported they would buy an item that was upcycled. Upcycling has not only become increasingly popular for thrifted clothing, but also for luxury brands which have started reusing fabrics from previous collections to upcycle them.

== Sustainability ==
While the previous motive for shopping at thrift stores among consumers was budget and necessity, sustainability is the new reason most consumers shop at thrift stores. The National Association of Retail and Thrift Shops has attributed the increase in favorability of thrift shops to awareness of the need for waste reduction and environmental impact. They have also credited generation-z for popularizing thrift shopping as a sustainability effort. Other sustainability methods surrounding thrifted clothing, and clothing in general, include clothes swapping, renting clothing pieces, using old clothes as cleaning rags, and recycling clothes. Over 60 percent of Gen Z shoppers look for secondhand options before purchasing new items, and they are motivated by sustainability as well as personal expression.

== See also ==
- Vintage (design)
- Vintage clothing
- Mitumba clothing
- Garage punk fashion
- 1970s teenage fashion
- 1990s in Western fashion
- 2000s in Western fashion
- 2010s in Western fashion
