= Famolare =

American footwear company

- Industry: Fashion
- Founded: 1969
- Founder: Joe Famolare Jr.
- Headquarters: New York City
- Website: www.famolare.com

Famolare is a footwear company founded in 1969. It was active for several years before its hiatus, and multiple designs appear in the Metropolitan Museum of Art in NYC.

== History ==
The shoe company was founded in 1969 by Joe Famolare Jr., featuring a method of absorbing the shock of walking on the foot. Stanley Marcus of Neiman Marcus wrote that Famolare was the most consistent or popular luxury brand in footwear alongside other name brands in the US like Kleenex and the Four Seasons hotel. The company was headquartered in NYC. Famolare was known for its thick, wavy soles, which they named “four-wave platforms”.They patented the sole. The Famolare shoes, according to the New York Times coverage in 1975, were manufacturing its shoes in Florence, Italy with the officies in the United States, Switzerland and New Zealand.

Famolare became known for its provocative advertising, including ads where women were naked but for their shoes, however they reversed course in the 1980s. The change in advertising led the company to receive the Liberty Award from Ms. Magazine in 1981 for “non-sexist advertisement”. By the 1990s the shoe brand was available by mail order. Several styles of shoes have been preserved in the Met Museum in NYC, including the "Violin" created in 1971, a pair of clogs created in 1973, and a pair of 1975 sandals.
