= Wheat (color) =

Light yellow-brown shade

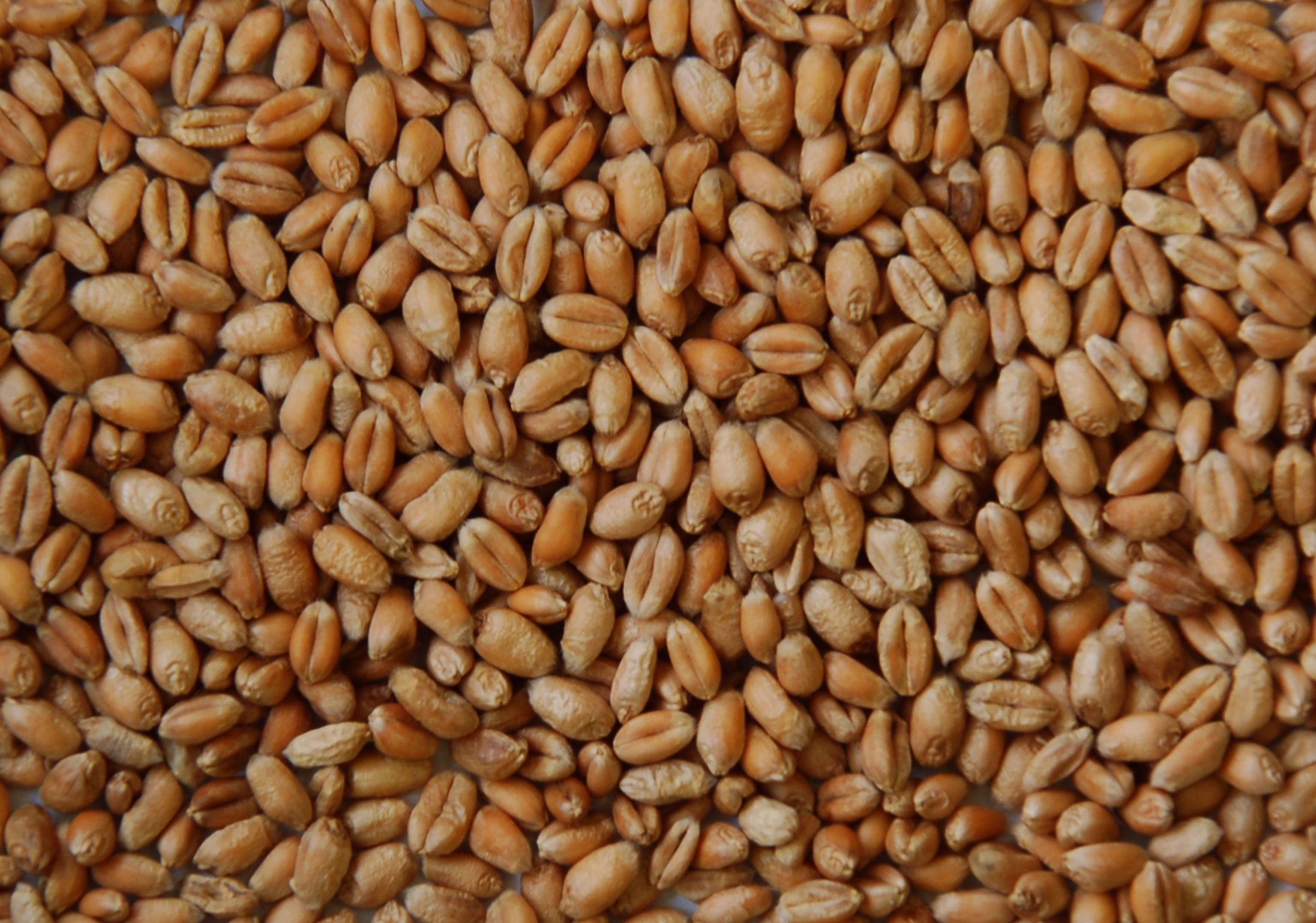
- Wheat grain.

Color coordinates
- Hex triplet: #F5DEB3
- sRGB^{B} (r, g, b): (245, 222, 179)
- HSV (h, s, v): (39°, 27%, 96%)
- CIELCh_{uv} (L, C, h): (89, 38, 64°)
- Source: X11
- ISCC–NBS descriptor: Pale yellow
- B: Normalized to [0–255] (byte)

Wheat is a color that resembles the light yellow of the wheat grain.

The first recorded use of wheat as a color name in English was in 1711.

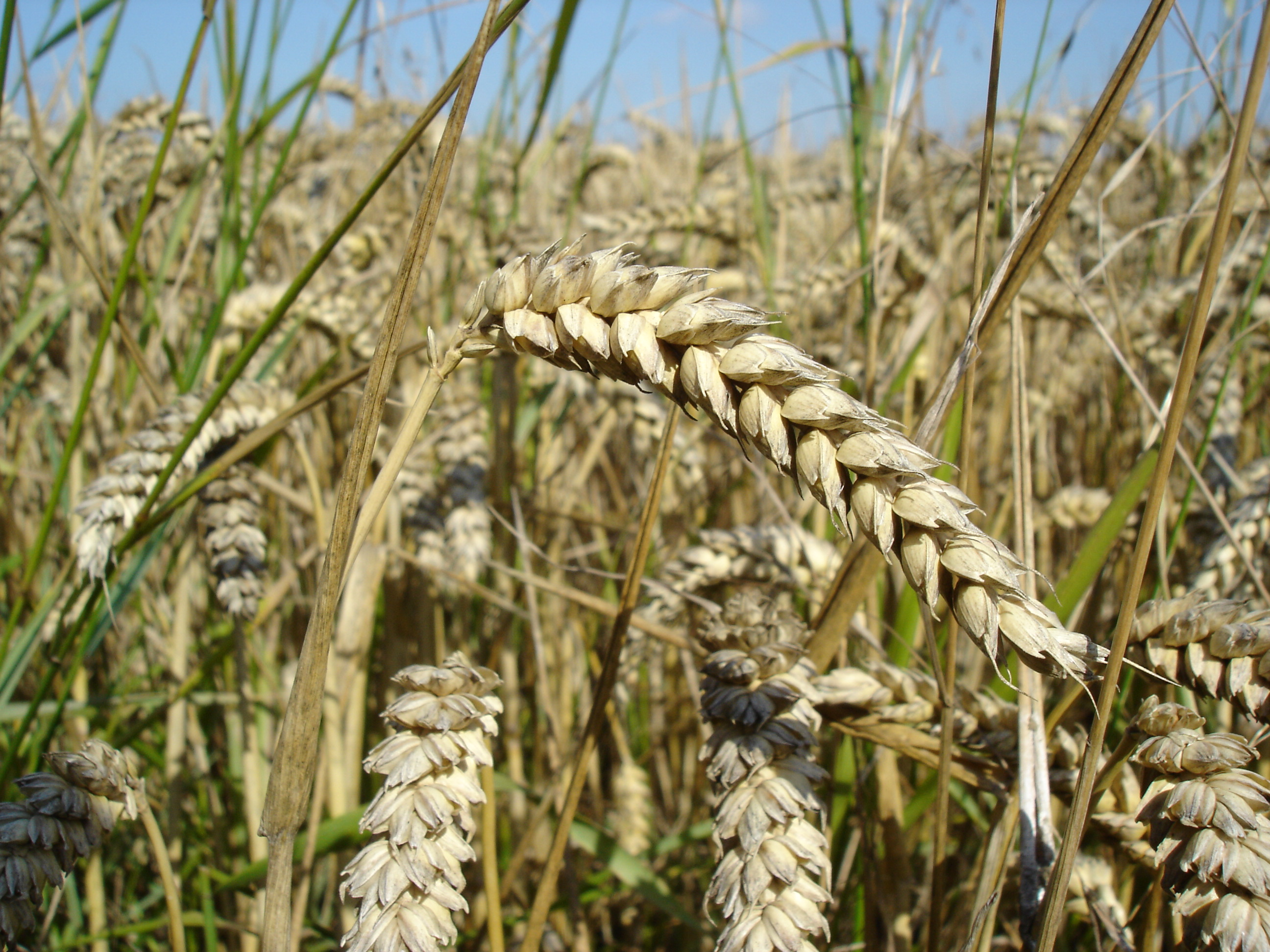
Wheat

Wheat is one of the X11 web colors.

== See also ==
- List of colors
