= Maud Frizon =

French fashion designer (born 1941)

Maud Frizon de Marco
- Born: Danielle Maud Frizon; 1941 (age 84–85); Paris, France
- Occupation: Fashion designer
- Years active: 1960s–1999
- Notable work: Exclusive shoe designs for Thierry Mugler, Claude Montana, Azzedine Alaia, Missoni, Sonia Rykiel
- Spouse: Luigi De Marco

Maud Frizon de Marco (born Danielle Maud Frizon; 1941 in Paris, France) is a fashion designer specializing in women's shoes. She began her career in the 1960s as a model for Parisian Haute Couture Houses of Nina Ricci, Jean Patou, and André Courrèges. At the time models had to provide their own shoes to match the clothes designers assigned them for their runway shows and photo shoots. Frizon disliked the available shoes from other designers, and in 1969 elected to create her own and opened her first boutique in the Saint-Germain-des-Prés district of Paris.

That first shoe collection, with each pair hand-cut and finished, was praised by critics as sexy and unpredictable. Frizon was an immediate success. Building on the traditions of Beth Levine and foreshadowing the later designs of Manolo Blahnik, Frizon shoes were showy and extravagant, and her name joined the ranks of the haute couture boutiques. By 1979, Frizon had ten shoe boutiques across Europe and in New York and was overtaking in influence prominent shoe designers like Charles Jourdan, Andrea Pfister, and Walter Steiger. Her 1978 interpretation of the then-popular cowboy boot trend, which she named the Ringo boot, was widely copied. She is credited with introducing the influential 1978-79 cone heel that continued into the early 1980s. At the height of her success in the 1980s her reputation was similar to that of Blahnik today.

Frizon often used expensive and everyday materials together in unusual combinations: lizard and snake, suede and satin, canvas and crocodile. Brigitte Bardot was a regular at the boutique, famous for her love of Frizon's high-heeled Russian boots.

In Shoes – Fashion and Fantasy Colin McDowell wrote "If shoes can be said to have a personality, none have more so than the products of Maud Frizon's imagination. [They are] original and innovative shoes that [are] to footwear what Dom Perignon is to champagne".

Although Frizon released shoes under her brands Maud Frizon and Miss Maud, she also designed footwear for Azzedine Alaia, Missoni, Fendi, and Sonia Rykiel, among others. She was the exclusive shoe designer in the late seventies and early eighties for the influential Thierry Mugler and Claude Montana lines.

She is married to Luigi De Marco with whom she founded and operated her company.

In 1999 Frizon and De Marco sold the company and its brands to Helene Wajnblum-Liu and her husband, who added handbags and leather accessories to the line as well as expanding the chain of Frizon boutiques. The firm remains headquartered in Paris, with boutiques in Paris, Lyon, New York, Beijing and Hong Kong.
