= Sexual fetishism =

Sexual arousal a person receives from an object or situation

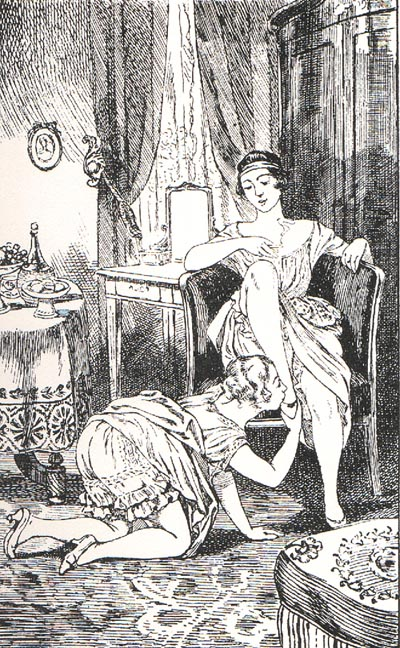
- Illustration depicting foot fetishism where a submissive woman worships another woman's foot, from La Comtesse au fouet (1926)
- Specialty: Psychiatry, clinical psychology

Sexual fetishism is a sexual fixation on anything not considered sexual by its respective nature. The object of interest is called the fetish; the person who has a fetish is a fetishist. A sexual fetish may be regarded as a mental disorder if it causes significant psychosocial distress for the person or has detrimental effects on important areas of their life. Sexual arousal from a particular body part can be further classified as partialism.

Medical definitions restrict the term sexual fetishism to objects or body parts. In common language, fetish is also used for a sexual interest in specific activities, people, types of people, substances, or situations.

== Definitions ==
The word fetish is commonly used for any sexually arousing stimuli, not all of which meet the medical criteria for fetishism. This broader usage of fetish covers parts or features of the body (including obesity and body modifications), objects, situations and activities (such as smoking or BDSM). Paraphilias such as urophilia, necrophilia and coprophilia have been described as fetishes.

Originally, most medical sources defined fetishism as a sexual interest in non-living objects, body parts or secretions. The publication of the DSM-III in 1980 changed that, by excluding arousal from body parts in its diagnostic criteria for fetishism. In 1987, the revised DSM-III-R introduced a new diagnosis for body part arousal called partialism. The DSM-IV retained this distinction. Martin Kafka argued that partialism should be merged into fetishism because of overlap between the two conditions. The DSM-5 subsequently did so in 2013.

== Types ==
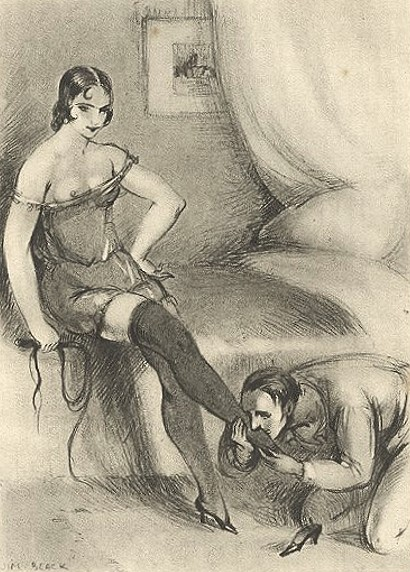
A submissive man worshipping a woman's foot, from Dresseuses d'Hommes (1931)

In a review of 48 cases of clinical fetishism in 1983, fetishes included clothing (58.3%), rubber and rubber items (22.9%), footwear (14.6%), body parts (14.6%), leather (10.4%), and soft materials or fabrics (6.3%). A 2007 study counted members of Internet discussion groups with the word fetish in their name. Of the groups about body parts or features, 47% belonged to groups about feet (podophilia), 9% about body fluids (including urophilia, scatophilia, lactaphilia, menophilia, mucophilia), 9% about body size, 7% about hair (hair fetish), and 5% about muscles (muscle worship). Less popular groups focused on navels (navel fetishism), legs, body hair, mouth, and nails, among other things. Of the groups about clothing, 33% belonged to groups about clothes worn on the legs or buttocks (such as stockings or skirts), 32% about footwear (shoe fetishism), 12% about underwear (underwear fetishism), and 9% about whole-body wear such as jackets. Less popular object groups focused on headwear, stethoscopes, wristwear, pacifiers, and diapers (diaper fetishism).

Erotic asphyxiation is the use of choking to increase the pleasure in sex. The fetish also includes an individualized part that involves choking oneself during the act of masturbation, which is known as auto-erotic asphyxiation. This usually involves a person being connected and strangled by a homemade device that is tight enough to give them pleasure but not tight enough to suffocate them to death. This is dangerous due to the issue of hyperactive pleasure seeking which can result in strangulation when there is no one to help if the device gets too tight and strangles the user.

Devotism involves being attracted to disability or body modifications on another person that are the result of amputation for example. Devotism is only a sexual fetish when the person who has the fetish considers the amputated body part on another person the object of sexual interest.

== Cause ==
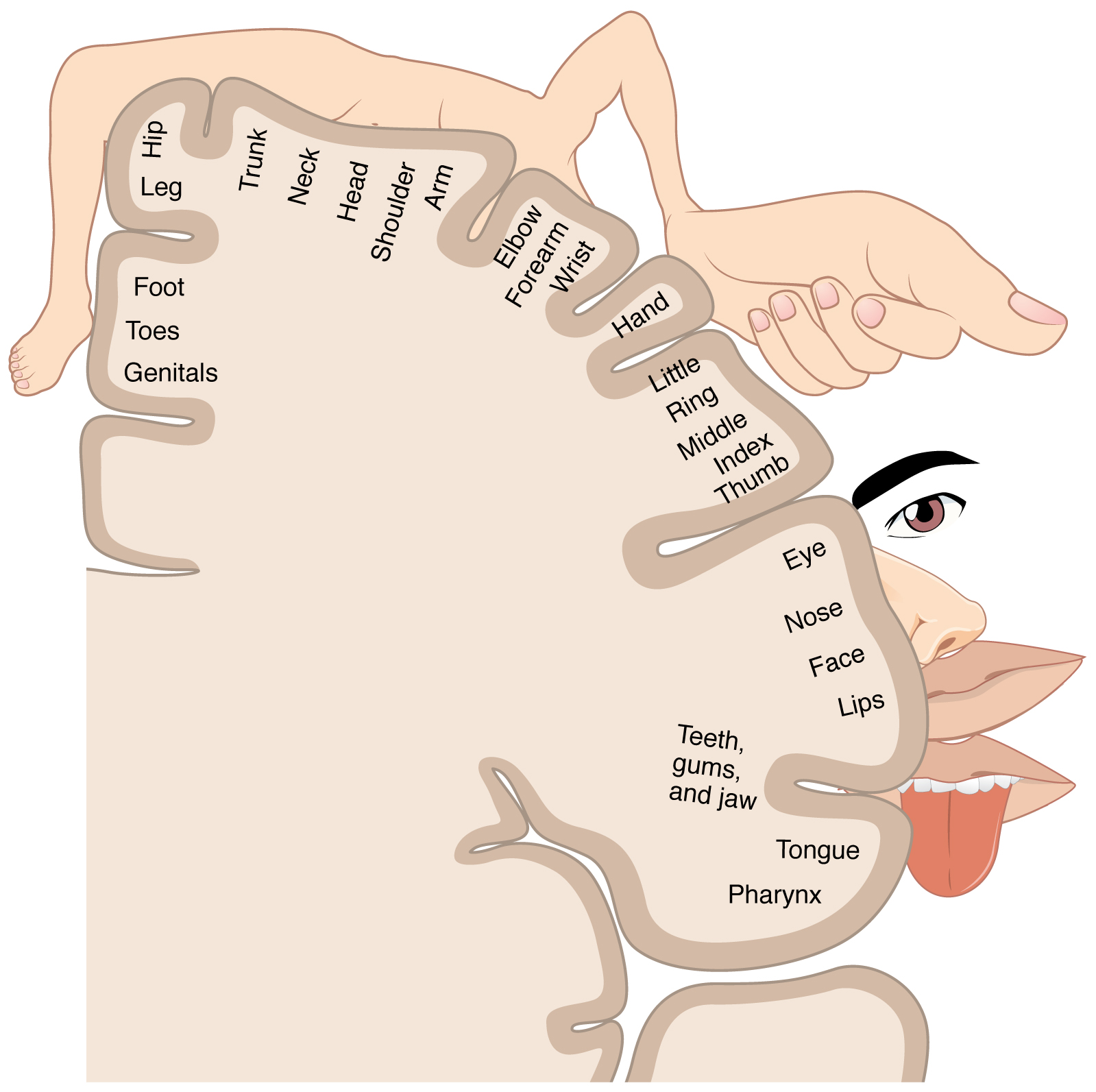
The sensory regions for the feet and genitals lie next to each other, as shown in this cortical homunculus.

Fetishism and paraphilias in general usually becomes evident during puberty, but may develop prior to that. No single cause for fetishism has been conclusively established. Currently widely accepted etiological models hypothesize paraphilias to originate from a complex set of neurological, social, and cultural factors in a given person. Different paraphilias may have different causes, and there is no guarantee that two persons with the same paraphilias as the other would be interested in the same aspects of it or have the same ultimate cause for its development.

From a personality perspective, fetishists in studies generally report higher levels of introversion, impersonal sexual activity such as masturbation and less satisfaction with life and relationships. Hypersexual behavior increased the odds ratio for some fetishes and paraphilias, with a ratio of 4.6 in males and 25.6 in females, according to a 1996 Swedish study.

Some explanations invoke classical conditioning. In several experiments, men have been conditioned to show arousal to stimuli like boots, geometric shapes or penny jars by pairing these cues with conventional erotica. According to John Bancroft, conditioning alone cannot explain fetishism, because it does not result in fetishism for most people. He suggests that conditioning combines with some other factor, such as an abnormality in the sexual learning process. Social learning theories which combine social cognition and operant conditioning have also been proposed as an explanation for how fetishes may be learned, with the hypothesis being that fetishism is induced by the brain mistaking the object of arousal as a culturally appropriate source of sexual desire due to the unique experiences of the fetishist. Men who report being sexually rejected often are more likely to develop partialism and fetishism towards other objects such as undergarments, which is believed to be a reaction where the person learns over time to value the non-human parts of potential partners as a social response.

Theories of sexual imprinting propose that humans learn to recognize sexually desirable features and activities during childhood. Fetishism could result when a child is imprinted with an overly narrow or incorrect concept of a sex object.

Imprinting seems to occur during the child's earliest experiences with arousal and desire, and is based on "an egocentric evaluation of salient reward- or pleasure-related characteristics that differ from one individual to another."

Neurological differences may play a role in some cases. Vilayanur S. Ramachandran observed that the region processing sensory input from the feet lies immediately next to the region processing genital stimulation, and suggested an accidental link between these regions could explain the prevalence of foot fetishism. This has been disputed by a meta-analysis and experiment done by a 2013 study, showing a lack of correlation between foot stimulation, other stimulation to areas, and erotic behavior, though it did not explicitly rule in or out the potential of another brain area responsible for eroticism. The study concluded that neurological mechanisms regarding fetishism are poorly understood.

Temporal lobe injuries and epilepsy have been linked to subsequent development of paraphilia in rare cases. In one case, an anterior temporal lobectomy relieved an epileptic man's fetish for safety pins.

Various explanations have been put forth for the rarity of female fetishists. Most fetishes are visual in nature, and males are thought to be more sexually sensitive to visual stimuli. Roy Baumeister suggests that male sexuality is unchangeable, except for a brief period in childhood during which fetishism could become established, while female sexuality is fluid throughout life.

== Diagnosis ==
Under the DSM-5, fetishism is sexual arousal from nonliving objects or specific nongenital body parts, excluding clothes used for cross-dressing (as that falls under transvestic fetishism) and sex toys that are designed for genital stimulation. In order to be diagnosed as fetishistic disorder, the arousal must persist for at least six months and cause significant psychosocial distress or impairment in important areas of their life. In the DSM-IV, sexual interest in body parts was distinguished from fetishism under the name partialism (diagnosed as Paraphilia NOS), but it was merged with fetishistic disorder for the DSM-5.

The ReviseF65 project campaigned for the International Classification of Diseases (ICD)’s fetish-related diagnoses to be abolished completely to avoid stigmatizing fetishists. On 18 June 2018, the WHO (World Health Organization) published ICD-11, in which fetishism and fetishistic transvestism (cross-dressing for sexual pleasure) are now removed as psychiatric diagnoses. Moreover, discrimination against fetish-having and BDSM individuals is considered inconsistent with human rights principles endorsed by the United Nations and The World Health Organization.

== Treatment ==
According to the World Health Organization, fetishistic fantasies are common and should only be treated as a disorder when they impair normal functioning or cause distress. On 18 June 2018, the WHO (World Health Organization) published ICD-11, in which fetishism and fetishistic transvestism (cross-dressing for sexual pleasure) are now removed as psychiatric diagnoses. Moreover, discrimination against fetish-having and BDSM individuals is considered inconsistent with human rights principles endorsed by the United Nations and The World Health Organization.

Goals of treatment can include elimination of criminal activity, reduction in reliance on the fetish for sexual satisfaction, improving relationship skills, reducing or removing arousal to the fetish altogether, or increasing arousal towards more acceptable stimuli. The evidence for treatment efficacy is limited and largely based on case studies, and no research on treatment for female fetishists exists.

Cognitive behavioral therapy is one popular approach. Cognitive behavioral therapists teach clients to identify and avoid antecedents to fetishistic behavior, and substitute non-fetishistic fantasies for ones involving the fetish. Aversion therapy and covert conditioning can reduce fetishistic arousal in the short term, but requires repetition to sustain the effect. Multiple case studies have also reported treating fetishistic behavior with psychodynamic approaches.

Antiandrogens may be prescribed to lower sex drive. Cyproterone acetate is the most commonly used antiandrogen, except in the United States, where it may not be available. A large body of literature has shown that it reduces general sexual fantasies. Side effects may include osteoporosis, liver dysfunction, and feminization. Case studies have found that the antiandrogen medroxyprogesterone acetate is successful in reducing sexual interest, but can have side effects including osteoporosis, diabetes, deep vein thrombosis, feminization, and weight gain. Some hospitals use leuprorelin and goserelin to reduce libido, and while there is presently little evidence for their efficacy, they have fewer side effects than other antiandrogens. A number of studies support the use of selective serotonin reuptake inhibitors (SSRIs), which may be preferable over antiandrogens because of their relatively benign side effects. Pharmacological agents are an adjunctive treatment which are usually combined with other approaches for maximum effect.

Relationship counselors may attempt to reduce dependence on the fetish and improve partner communication using techniques like sensate focusing. Partners may agree to incorporate the fetish into their activities in a controlled, time-limited manner, or set aside only certain days to practice the fetishism. If the fetishist cannot sustain an erection without the fetish object, the therapist might recommend orgasmic reconditioning or covert sensitization to increase arousal to normal stimuli (although the evidence base for these techniques is weak).

== Occurrence ==
The prevalence of fetishism is not known with certainty. Fetishism is more common in males. In a 2011 study, 30% of men reported fetishistic fantasies, and 24.5% had engaged in fetishistic acts. Of those reporting fantasies, 45% said the fetish was intensely sexually arousing. In a 2014 study, 26.3% of women and 27.8% of men acknowledged any fantasies about "having sex with a fetish or non-sexual object". A content analysis of the sample's favorite fantasies found that 14% of the male fantasies involved fetishism (including feet, nonsexual objects, and specific clothing), and 4.7% focused on a specific body part other than feet. None of the women's favorite fantasies had fetishistic themes. Another study found that 28% of men and 11% of women reported fetishistic arousal (including feet, fabrics, and objects "like shoes, gloves, or plush toys"). 18% of men in a 1980 study reported fetishistic fantasies.

Fetishism to the extent that it is seen as a disorder appears to be rare, with less than 1% of general psychiatric patients presenting fetishism as their primary problem. It is also uncommon in forensic populations.

== History ==
The word fetish derives from the French fétiche, which comes from the Portuguese feitiço ("spell"), which in turn derives from the Latin facticius ("artificial") and facere ("to make"). A fetish is an object believed to have supernatural powers, or in particular, a human-made object that has power over others. Essentially, fetishism is the attribution of inherent value or powers to an object. Fétichisme was first used in an erotic context by Alfred Binet in 1887. A slightly earlier concept was Julien Chevalier's azoophilie.

=== Early perspectives on cause ===
Alfred Binet suspected fetishism was the pathological result of associations. He argued that, in certain vulnerable individuals, an emotionally rousing experience with the fetish object in childhood could lead to fetishism. Richard von Krafft-Ebing and Havelock Ellis also believed that fetishism arose from associative experiences, but disagreed on what type of predisposition was necessary.

The sexologist Magnus Hirschfeld followed another line of thought when he proposed his theory of partial attractiveness in 1920. According to his argument, sexual attractiveness never originates in a person as a whole but always is the product of the interaction of individual features. He stated that nearly everyone had special interests and thus suffered from a healthy kind of fetishism, while only detaching and overvaluing of a single feature resulted in pathological fetishism. Today, Hirschfeld's theory is often mentioned in the context of gender role specific behavior: females present sexual stimuli by highlighting body parts, clothes or accessories; males react to them.

Sigmund Freud believed that sexual fetishism in men derived from the unconscious fear of the mother's genitals, from men's universal fear of castration, and from a man's fantasy that his mother had had a penis but that it had been cut off. He did not discuss sexual fetishism in women.

In 1951, Donald Winnicott presented his theory of transitional objects and phenomena, according to which childish actions like thumb sucking and objects like cuddly toys are the source of manifold adult behavior, amongst many others fetishism. He speculated that the child's transitional object became sexualized.

=== Present Day: Sociocultural and Digital Contexts ===
Due to the introduction of social media into people's dating lives in the current decade, there has been an increase in inquiries about what has become the new "normal." In order to specify what "normal" means, we have to define it, in which case would be what is currently deemed socially acceptable. The assimilation of websites like "OnlyFans" and "Reddit" into dating have led to an increase of safe spaces with people who want to try new things. Performers in sites like these that can create some sort of "boundary work" where those that have no experience can start researching and see the differences between "vanilla" and "fetish" content.

On the other hand, a more generalized cultural and philosophical debate shows how gendered roles and what is usually depicted as socially normal influences how fetishism is perceived. Individual preferences also influences how fetishism is perceived. In a 2021 journal, Keller contends that interpretations of culture that relate to desire, individualism, and objectification play quite a significant role in how objects or bodies become fetishized. This implies that whatever is classified as "normal" versus what is considered a "fetish" is never neutral but rather constructed within a much broader, ethical, and social framework. This viewpoint emphasizes that online people-drawn boundaries are a part of ever changing cultural deliberations around sexuality, which supports findings from research on digital platforms.

== Other animals ==
Human fetishism has been compared to Pavlovian conditioning of sexual response in other animals. Sexual attraction to certain cues can be artificially induced in rats. Both male and female rats will develop a sexual preference for neutrally or even noxiously scented partners if those scents are paired with their early sexual experiences. Injecting morphine or oxytocin into a male rat during its first exposure to scented females has the same effect. Rats will also develop sexual preferences for the location of their early sexual experiences, and can be conditioned to show increased arousal in the presence of objects such as a plastic toy fish. One experiment found that rats which are made to wear a Velcro tethering jacket during their formative sexual experiences exhibit severe deficits in sexual performance when not wearing the jacket. Similar sexual conditioning has been demonstrated in gouramis, marmosets and Japanese quails.

Possible boot fetishism has been reported in two different primates from the same zoo. Whenever a boot was placed near the first, a common chimpanzee born in captivity, he would invariably stare at it, touch it, become erect, rub his penis against the boot, masturbate, and then consume his ejaculate. The second, a guinea baboon, would become erect while rubbing and smelling the boot, but not masturbate or touch it with his penis.

== See also ==
- Breast fetishism
- Catfight
- Charles Guyette
- Counterphobic attitude
- Eric Stanton
- Fetish club
- Fetish fashion
- Gene Bilbrew
- Irving Klaw
- John Willie
- Kink (sexuality)
- List of paraphilias
- List of universities with BDSM clubs
- Paraphilia
- Phallic woman
- Racial fetishism
- Steatopygia

=== Clothing fetishism and fetish–related ===
- Clothing fetish
- Cosplay
- PVC clothing
- Sexual roleplay
- Transvestic fetishism
- Uniform fetishism

== Sources ==
- Ventriglio, Antonio; Bhat, P.S.; Torales, Julio; Bhugra, Dinesh (April 2019). "Sexuality in the 21st century: Leather or rubber? Fetishism explained". Medical Journal Armed Forces India. 75 (2): 121–124. doi:10.1016/j.mjafi.2018.09.009. PMC 6495465. PMID 31065177.
