= Legman =

Legman or Leg man may refer to:

- Gershon Legman (1917–1999), American cultural critic and folklorist
- Legman, a journalist reporting from the scene of an event
- A male with a leg fetish, a type of partialism
