= Cultural views on the midriff and navel =

Cultural views on the midriff and navel vary.

== Western culture ==
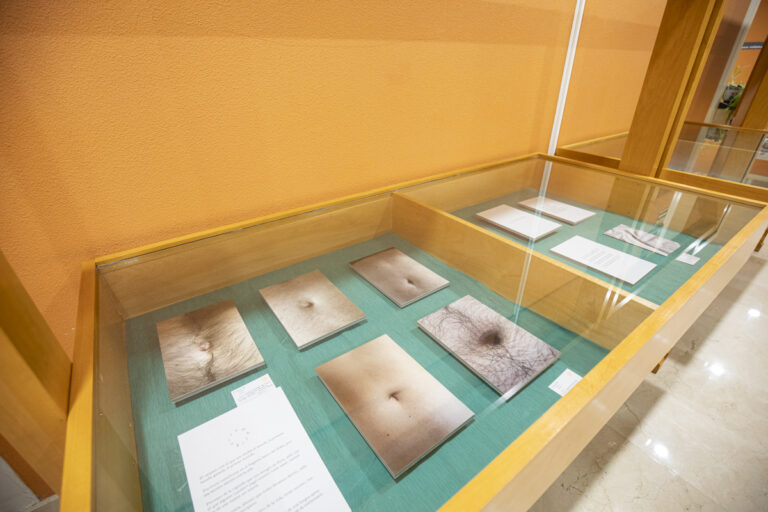
Exhibition of photos of writers' navels published in the Spanish cultural magazine Mirlo

The public exposure of the male and female midriff and bare navel has been taboo at times in Western cultures, being considered immodest or indecent. It was banned in some jurisdictions. Eventually, only female navel exposure was banned and not male because, it was argued, the simulation or upward displacement from vagina to navel was commonplace and obvious in women.

=== Film ===
In the United States, the Motion Picture Production Code, or Hays Code, enforced after 1934, banned the exposure of the female navel in Hollywood films. The National Legion of Decency, a Roman Catholic body guarding over American media content, also pressured Hollywood to keep clothing that exposed certain parts of the female body, such as bikinis and low-cut dresses, from being featured in Hollywood movies.

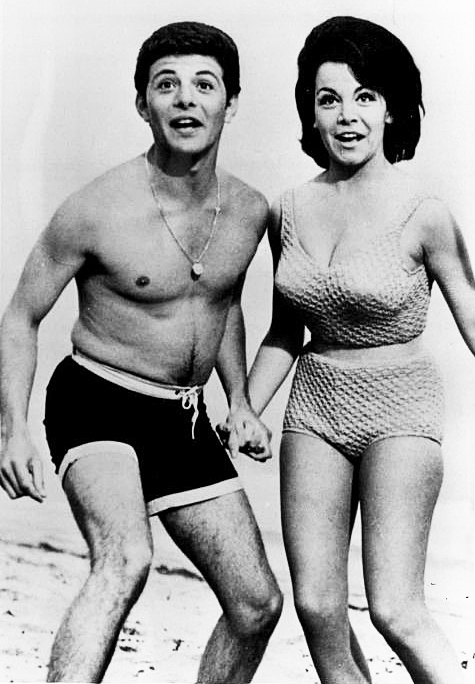
Frankie Avalon and Annette Funicello in publicity photo for the series of Beach Party films, 1963

During the 1950s, Joan Collins was prohibited by the censors from exposing her navel in Land of the Pharaohs (1955). To get around the censors' guidelines, she wore a jewel, a ruby, in her navel. Kim Novak wore a ruby jewel in her navel for the film Jeanne Eagels (1957); saying in an interview, "they had to glue it in every time. I got a terrible infection from it." Marilyn Monroe, for a scene from Some Like It Hot (1959), wore a dress that revealed skin everywhere but had a small piece of fabric to hide her navel. (The film was condemned by the National Legion of Decency, but for other reasons.)

By the 1960s, community standards had changed. Marilyn Monroe was allowed to expose her navel in Something's Got to Give (1962) and later commented, "I guess the censors are willing to recognize that everybody has a navel." Ursula Andress, appearing as Honey Ryder in the 1962 James Bond film, Dr. No, wore her iconic white bikini, which exposed her midriff and navel. However, when Annette Funicello was cast in her first beach movie Beach Party (1963), Walt Disney, who held her contract, insisted that she only wear modest bathing suits and keep her navel covered, to preserve her wholesome persona, though she was the only one of the ample number of young women in the film not bikini-clad. In the 1967 film Follow That Camel, actress Anita Harris wore a jewel on her navel for a belly-dancing sequence.

The Hays Code was abandoned soon after, with it the prohibition of female navel exposure and other restrictions. The influence of the National Legion of Decency had also waned by the 1960s. With the withdrawal of the Code and the change to a classification regime, the ban on the exposure of parts of the human body that had previously been regarded as immodest or indecent was withdrawn; and with it, there was an increasing level of body exposure over time. The exposure of the navel ceased to be controversial in the context of a general increase in nudity. In the 2000s, Devon Aoki's bad girl character Suki in 2 Fast 2 Furious wore low rise pants and a cut off crop-top exposing her midriff and belly button was a popular iconic style. During the audition for Transformers, Megan Fox was once told from Michael Bay about the looks of her stomach for the role.

=== Television ===
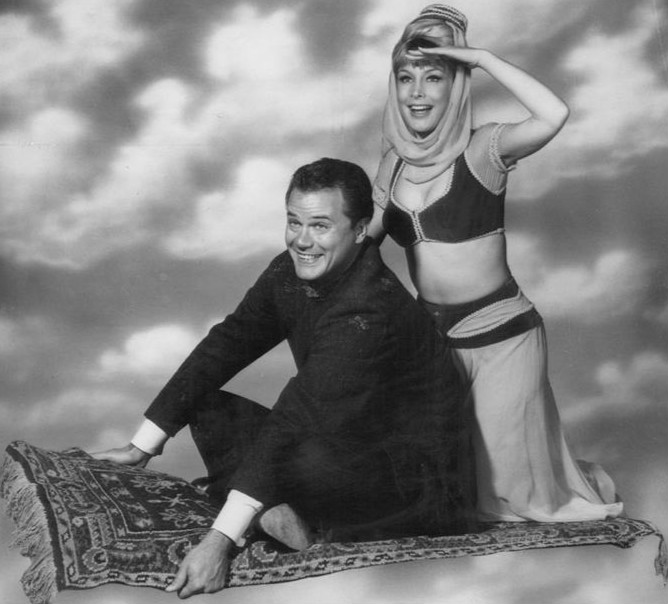
Barbara Eden in a publicity photo of 1960s TV show I Dream of Jeannie

In 1951, the United States Code of Practices for Television Broadcasters came into force, which, besides other things, prohibited female navel exposure on American television. During the 1960s, Barbara Eden was not allowed to show her navel on the NBC TV show I Dream of Jeannie (1965–1970). Her pants had to be worn above the navel, which became ineffective. After a few frames of her navel exposure went unnoticed, they decided to use fabric and skin-colored makeup to conceal her navel. Her costume became low-rise (without censorship) in 1985 and in 2013, 81-year-old Eden attended the Life Ball event in Vienna dressed in the same costume of I Dream of Jeannie but revealing her navel. In February 1964, Scandinavian Airlines placed an advertisement in newspapers and magazines throughout the United States. It featured a blonde-haired, bikini-clad model exposing her belly button posing on a rock above the caption "What to show your wife in Scandinavia". The image that appeared in most publications had the belly button removed.

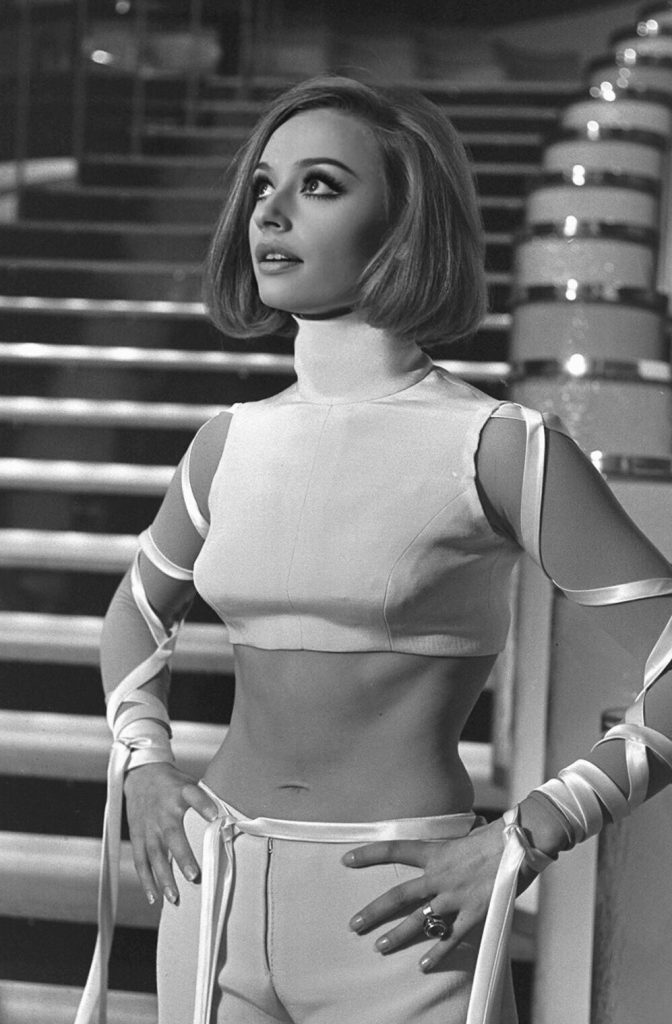
Raffaella Carrà in Canzonissima, 1970

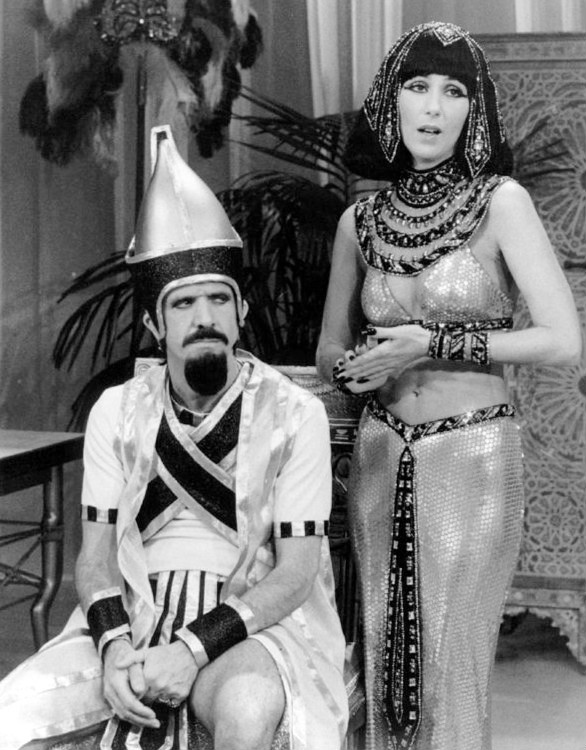
Cher exposing her navel for a scene from an Egyptian soap opera skit on The Sonny and Cher Show, 1977

The first exposure of a navel in a TV series occurred in 1961 on the Dr. Kildare series. Dawn Wells and Tina Louise were not allowed to expose their navels in Gilligan's Island (1964–1967). Wells was required to wear high-waisted shorts that covered her navel.

Raffaella Carrà was the first Italian woman and first TV personality to show her belly button on TV in 1970 garnering her criticisms from the Vatican. In The Sonny & Cher Comedy Hour (1971–1974), network censors feared Cher's navel exposure would become a cause célèbre at CBS. Cher once commented, "There were so many things that were censored—ideas and words. All I know is I got in trouble for showing my belly button, and every time I turned around after I went off the air, all you saw were Cheryl Ladd's boobs" (referring to Ladd's bikini scenes on Charlie's Angels). People magazine dubbed Cher "Pioneer of the Belly Beautiful".

The U.S. code of practice was suspended in 1983.

=== Music and entertainment ===
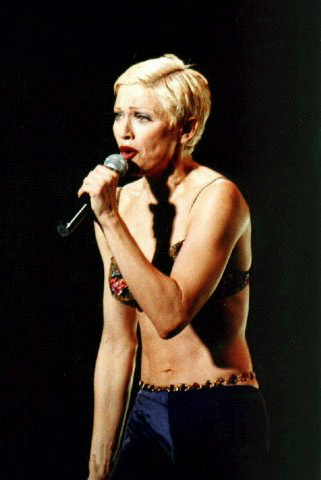
Madonna baring her midriff performing in 1993

==== Pre-1990 ====
Navel exposure became common in the culture of 20th-century music, with an establishing foothold during the mid-1970s, then becoming more prominent by the following decade, with many successful female popstars having appeared on and offstage and in music videos with their midriff exposed, usually wearing a crop top, including Madonna, during 1983, she caused controversy when she wore a mesh crop top in her video for the song "Lucky Star". People magazine wrote that Madonna made the bare navel her trademark.

Singer/actress Cher wore an Indian princess outfit with feathers and beads around her navel for the 58th Annual Academy Awards event in 1986. California-based fashion designer Christine Albers commented, "the look is good for anyone who has a great body but especially for women who do a lot of stomach exercises."

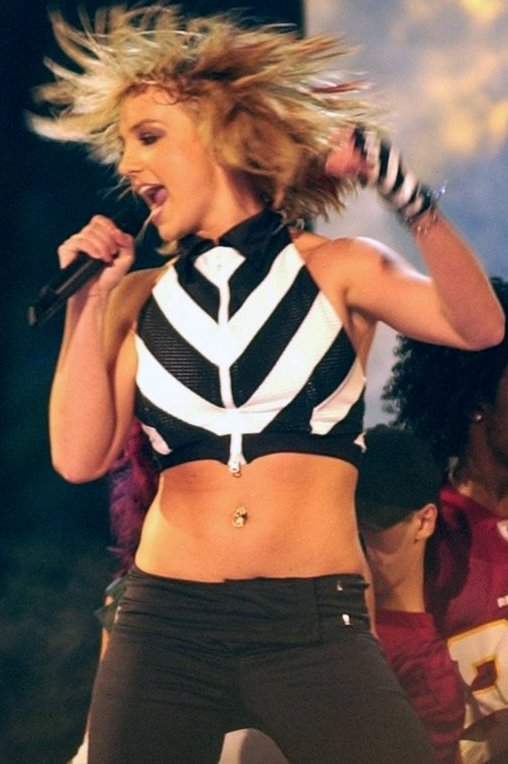
Britney Spears wearing a cropped top exposing her midriff and belly button piercing while performing in 2003

==== 1990s and 2000s ====
During the early 1990s, Canadian country singer Shania Twain appeared in low-rise jeans baring her midriff and navel in her music videos and performances. It became both the most widely discussed body part in country music and her trademark. Shania once commented, "Someone said to me once, 'Well, if I had your belly-button I'd sell 8 million albums too.' But it takes a lot more than a belly-button to sell more than 8 million albums." Jennifer Lopez is believed to have started the trend of exposing the navel on stage and red carpets. People magazine stated, "The 19-year-old hotshot chanteuse behind 'What a Girl Wants', once a Mouseketeer alongside Britney Spears, can't quite pull off pop star flash without belly-flopping." In 2001, the editors of Britannica commissioned an article on Britney Spears that deconstructs her bare midriff. The article describes Miss Spears's navel as "a heated boundary between baby and babe". She had been a major inspiration for the navel piercing trend. Spin magazine chose Madonna's navel as its "most incredible" rock star body part for a September 2005 feature. Gregorio Luke, former director of the Museum of Latin American Art who conducted lectures about belly buttons, said, "The belly button has been a sign of beauty in goddesses as different as Astarte, Venus or Aphrodite. We ask which is more beautiful, the perfectly round belly button of Jane Fonda or Raquel Welch's grain of coffee navel? Every star from Madonna to Shakira proudly displays their belly button."

On the contrary, American columnist Kathleen Parker in an article about Katharine Hepburn once commented, "Young movie-going girls today don't have access to many in the mold of Katharine Hepburn. Instead by mall observations most are Britney wannabes—hip-hugged, tattooed, pierced and out there. The female navel has become the refrigerator man's continental divide. I hate to break it to you, oh future daughters-in-law, but everybody's got a belly button. Your inney- or outey-ness is not the stuff either of revelation or revolution."

=== Fashion ===
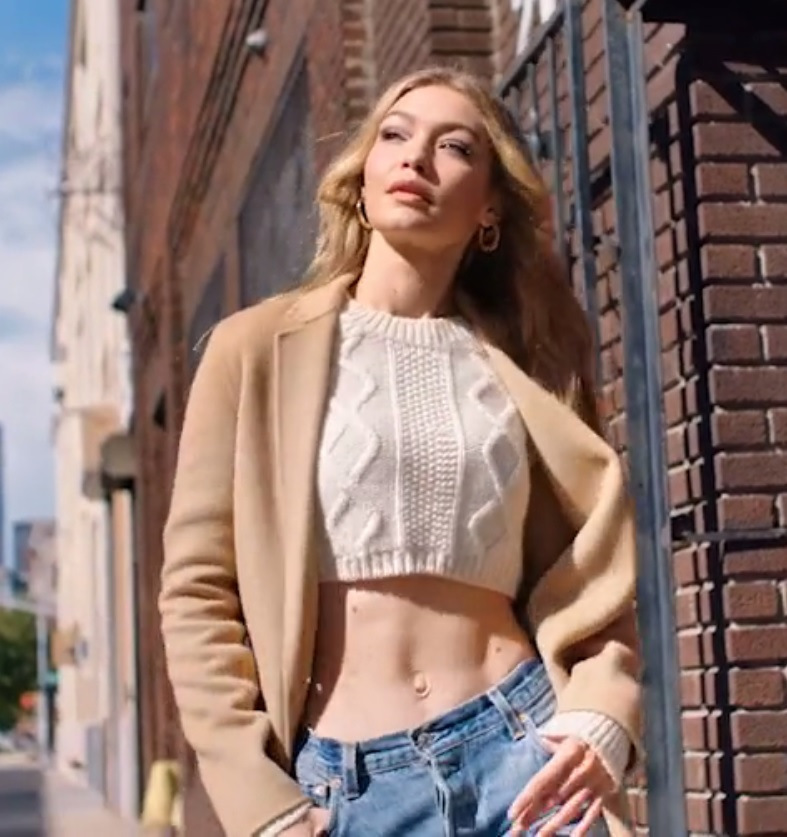
Gigi Hadid wearing a midriff baring crop top which exposes her outie belly button

Exposed midriff is associated with the crop top, often in association with low-rise clothing. Another way that the navel may be exposed is via a deep plunging neckline dress or top that drops below the natural waist line. Low-rise clothing began in the early 1990s, when the British magazine The Face featured Kate Moss in low-rise jeans on its March 1993 issue cover. Models such as Gisele Bündchen frequently flash their midriffs. In 1994, Art Cooper, editor-in-chief of GQ magazine said that his big seller in 1994 was the February issue with Geena Davis on the cover, on which she wore an Armani suit opened at the hips to reveal her navel. It sold about 400,000 copies. He stated, "Part of the success is the navel factor. I think the belly button is really an erogenous zone." In the 2020s, cutout wardrobes exposing wearer's belly button first started such as a Julia Garner's diamond-shaped midriff-baring dress in 2022 Emmys. Drawing an intense focus on their belly buttons has come being focal part of style and self-expression.

=== Sportswear ===
==== Swimwear ====
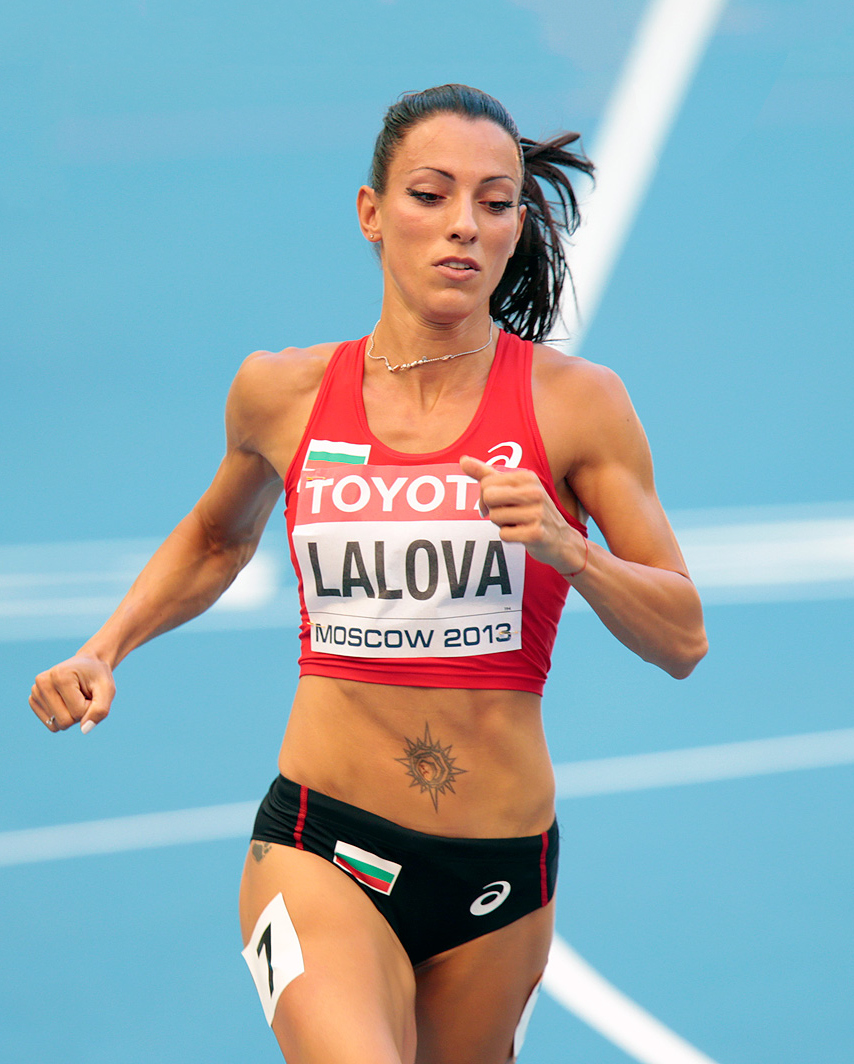
Bulgarian sprinter Ivet Lalova in a sports bikini with her navel tattoo

Displays of the female navel commenced with the introduction of the bikini in 1946, designed by Louis Réard, though two-piece swimsuits that exposed the midriff but covered the navel appeared in the 1930s. Réard could not find a model who would dare wear his brief design, so he hired Micheline Bernardini, a 19-year-old nude dancer from the Casino de Paris, as his model. Acceptance of the new-style swimsuit was very slow, and the bikini was not regarded as suitable clothing beyond the beach or pool. During the 1960s, Mary Quant's designs featured exposed navels and bare midriffs. Exposure of the male navel was limited well into the 1960s. Swimwear covered the lower abdomen and usually the navel. Occasionally the swimwear would be worn immediately below the navel. The swimwear evolved to longer legs and lower waistline. Male swimwear could neither be worn above the navel nor below the knee in events of the National Collegiate Athletic Association (NCAA).

==== Sports bikinis ====
Bikinis have become a major component of marketing of various women's sports, and female athletes often wear sports bikinis that expose the navel. Bulgarian athlete Ivet Lalova is known for her "tribal sun" tattoo around her navel. Croatian athlete Blanka Vlašić is famous for her navel piercing.

==== Golf ====
In Golf, dress codes prohibits shirts from exposing the midriff.

==== Track and field ====
Modern Olympics uniforms began with simple cotton tank tops for women beginning in 1900, when they started competing. In the 1990s, track and field athletes started to wear midriff-baring uniforms.

==== Beach sports ====
Woman athletes' uniforms often include bikini bottoms. By comparison, men wear polo shirts instead of being bare-chested. This became controversial in 2021, when the Norwegian Beach Handball team refused to wear bikini bottoms and was fined 150 euros (about $175) per player. In beach volleyball, many players do not mind wearing skimpy uniforms because of the conditions.

==== Cheerleading ====
The fashion later became increasingly popular through wearing styles, with tops comprising modified sports bras without additional outergarments, sports bikinis, and cheerleading style fashions. These developed largely from the styles originating with the Dallas Cowboys Cheerleaders in the early 1970s.

==== Tennis ====
Female tennis players are known for exposing their navels or navel piercings on court. American tennis player Serena Williams was noted by the media for exposing her belly button piercing during her matches. Retired Russian tennis player Anna Kournikova was also known for frequent navel exposure during her matches. In 2009, in an interview with the German magazine Der Spiegel, she said, "These are men's ravings. Why you should hide it, when it isn't necessary? Female beach volleyball players play in bikinis – does it bother anyone?" American female golfer Laura Diaz, commenting on the Ladies Professional Golf Association for Sports Illustrated, said: "The LPGA needs to acknowledge that a lot of people watch women's sports more for the women than for the sports. Why else would Anna Kournikova, who has never won a singles title, be the most popular player in women's tennis? We have quite a few attractive women, and we should use our looks to our advantage. After all, what's so wrong with seeing an occasional belly button?"

==== American football ====
Males often wear no shirt with low-rise shorts during practice in American football. Cropped jerseys were worn during 1980s broadcasts. Cropped jerseys became dormant for 20 years until male athletes returned to midriff exposure for comfort purposes. However, the NCAA placed an official ban on navel exposure in 2015. The National Football League has long had a ban on navel exposure, requiring jerseys to be tucked in. The NFL banned Ezekiel Elliott's crop top in September 2016.

== Mediterranean, Hebrew and Middle Eastern cultures ==
=== Literature and philosophy ===
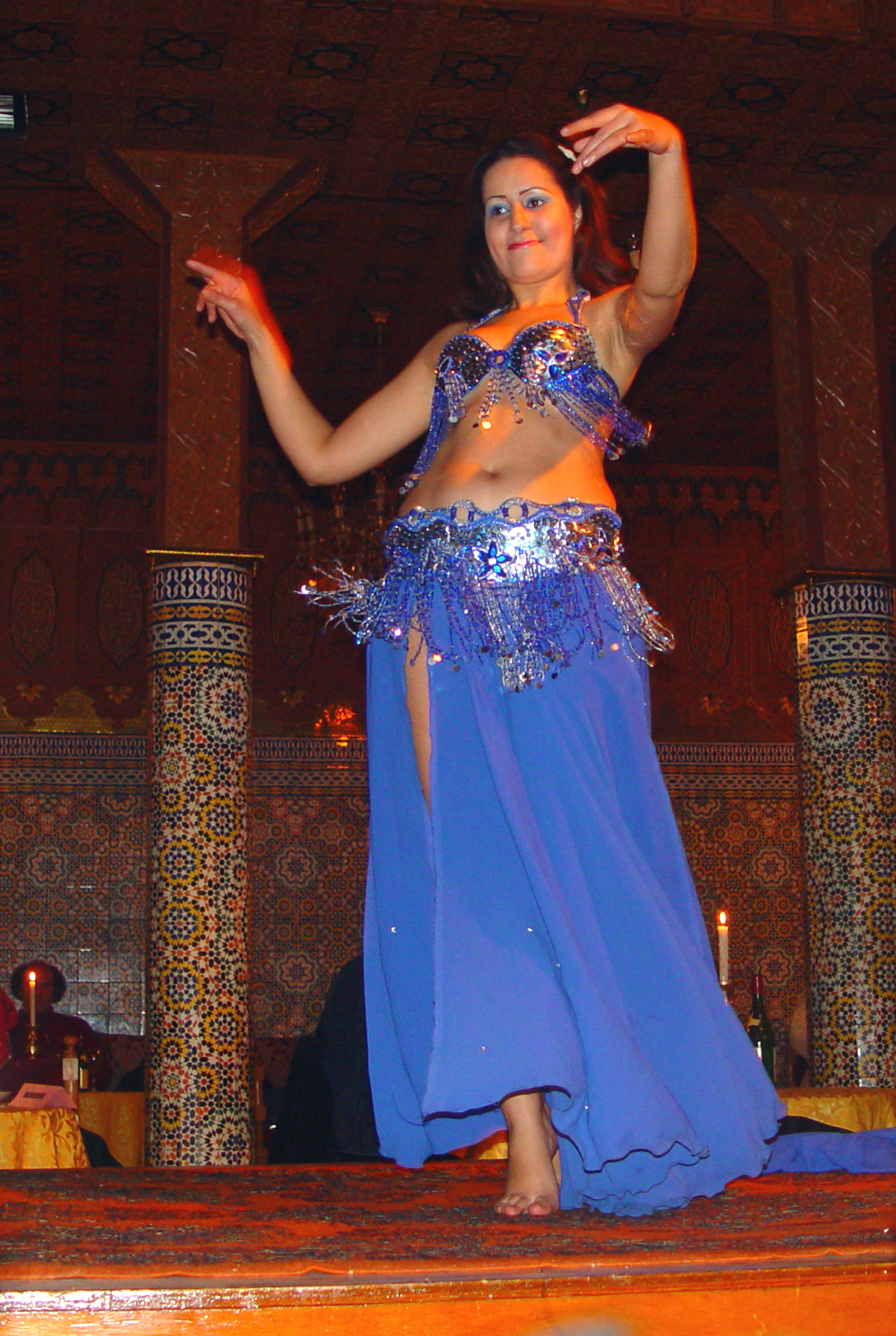
A belly dancer in Marrakesh in Morocco

In the Hebrew Bible the Song of Songs emphasizes the navel as an important element of a woman's beauty. It contains imagery similar to that in the love songs of ancient Egyptian literature. Song of Songs 7:2 states: "Your navel is a rounded bowl." The verse preceding the line mentioning the navel (Song of Songs 7:1) states, "your rounded thighs are like jewels, the work of a master hand", ) and the verse following states, "Your belly is a heap of wheat." Thus the treatment of the navel appears placed textually in between the description of the curves of a woman through thigh and the stomach or midriff. "Belly" also suggests the womb, and the combination of the imagery of the womb with that of wheat suggests the link between eroticism and fertility through the imagery of the navel and curvaceous thighs. These passages also celebrate a curvaceous stomach and midriff and plumpness as aspects of female physical attractiveness. The Ancient Greeks regarded the conical stone Omphalos (meaning "navel") located at Delphi as the center of the earth. The ancient Mediterranean, Hebrew, Israelite and Middle Eastern worldview commonly incorporated beliefs that shrines, important places (such as cities or capitals), or other such places of prominence had a position of centrality to the world. These domains constituted what contemporaries could regard as important bonds that linked the universe. Thus Nippur, an ancient city of Mesopotamia, was often described as the "navel" by Mesopotamians. This usage expressed connotations of the prominence of the location and the way it was seen to function as a place of centrality and as a link between earth and the heavens and the Universe.

In a similar vein, Jewish Midrashim state: "God created the world like an embryo. Just as the embryo begins at the navel and continues to grow from that point, so too the world. The Holy One, blessed be he, began the world from its navel. From there it was stretched hither and yon. Where is its navel? Jerusalem. And its (Jerusalem's) navel itself? The altar." This passage expresses the centrality of the ancient city of Jerusalem and of the altar of the ancient temple of Jerusalem within a cosmic framework equated to the navel of a mother and the source of life. Similar concepts appear in the Book of Jubilees 8:19 and in the Book of Enoch 26:1, which describes Mount Zion as "The center of the navel of the earth". Samaritan tradition sees Mount Gerizim as the navel of the earth, the only place not submerged in the deluge in the account of Noah's Ark. The phrase "navel of the earth" occurs in (Ezek 38:12; Judg 9:37) Aramaic tibbur ("navel") and the concept recurs in Ezek 16:4. According to Samaritan tradition, God made Adam from the dust of Mount Gerizim. The belly-dancing tradition of Mediterranean and Middle Eastern cultures also celebrates the navel. When Pope Urban II called (1095) for the First Crusade, he referred to Jerusalem as "the navel of the world".

=== Bans and controversies ===
In Egypt, dancing in public with an uncovered navel is illegal, so many dancers wear a body stocking or netting to cover their skin. An Egyptian singer named Ruby upset members of parliament and the TV authority, resulting in a ban on music videos showing a woman's navel.

== Indian culture ==
=== Ancient times ===
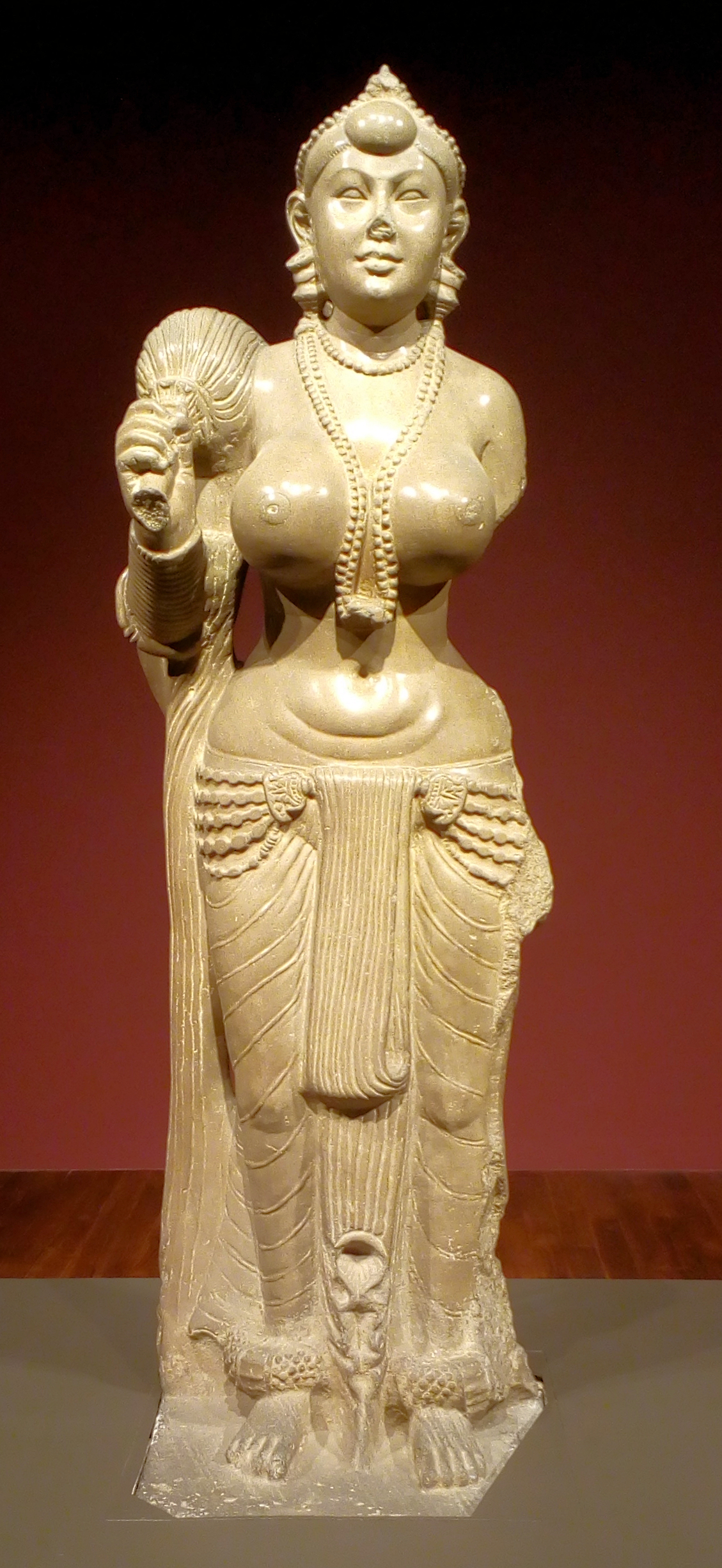
Didarganj Yakshi, a sculpture of a woman in navel-exposing attire

While the West was relatively resistant to midriff-baring clothing until the 1980s, it has long been a fashion with Indian women. These women, especially those from Southern India, have traditionally worn saris that bare the midriff. Women from Rajasthan leave the midriff exposed while wearing Ghagra cholis. These women often cover their heads with dupattas, and may cover their faces in front of strangers with ghoonghats. There is a belief associated with the religious in India that navel-baring has a symbolic, almost mystical, association with birth and life, and that the display is meant to emphasize the centrality of nature in the nurture role. In ancient Indian tradition, the navel of the god Vishnu is considered to be the center of the universe and the source of life. From his navel a new world emerges. This has been depicted in many ancient Indian sculptures as a lotus emerging from the navel on which god Brahma is seated.

Although depictions and descriptions of women's clothing in ancient and early medieval India usually show the midriff exposed, some Dharmaśāstra texts prescribed that women should not expose the navel. These prescriptive norms coexisted with varied clothing practices represented in ancient Indian art and literature. The trend of exposing the navel was started by women who were dancers, acrobats, or entertainers, and who developed a technique of wearing the sari like a pair of trousers well below the navel to assist in the free movement of the legs. Women in this type of attire are very common in many ancient Indian sculptures, and paintings.

Indian sculpture emphasised the centrality and sexuality that emanated from the depiction of the woman's navel. One of the most stunning examples would be Didarganj Yakshi, a statue of a woman made during the Mauryan period. Carved out of sandstone, which gives it a natural shine where the navel is deeply embedded within the centre of the torso, drawing the focus of the viewer. Before sculpting, the sculptors created an image and indicated the six structural centers, of which the navel is one, as defined by Yoga principles. Technically, the typical female representation in ancient Indian art includes an hourglass figure with large hips, breasts, and buttocks, and a deep navel. According to Indian physiognomy, if a woman's navel is deep, she is popular and loved by her husband. A broad, fleshy, shallow navel indicates a lucky woman. A woman with deep navel with a whirl to the right side is considered auspicious and is expected to lead a comfortable life. Famous Indian painter M. F. Husain once commented, "The belly button has always been in. It has been an intrinsic part of the Indian woman. It has been part of Indian sculptures that go back so many centuries. That is why so many years ago, even in the 50s, all my works had women show their belly buttons."

=== Recent times ===
With their migration to different countries, many Indian women began to wear the normal sari below the waistline, exposing the navel in a style known as a low-rise or low hip sari. For example, many actress has played multiple item songs wearing the pants below their waist, revealing the navel and bellybutton as a form of sensual beauty. The trend started during the 1950s, when saris were worn below the navel, with big pleats that were tightly draped across the curves of the body. Due to liberalization and changing global markets, saris are re-emerging as erotic apparel. As a result, saris began to be designed in innovative ways using different materials, such as transparent and semi-transparent saris made of sheer fabrics like chiffon. These modern saris may be draped in different ways, such as a petticoat being tied about 10 to 13 cm (4 to 5 in) below the navel, just above the pubic area, and a small blouse ending just below the breasts with a thin pallu exposing some part of the blouse and almost the entire midriff. In September 2012, The New York Times featured a wedding announcement with an image of a woman of Indian heritage displaying her navel in a gagra choli for the first time. This style was popularised by Bollywood celebrities and other popular regional film industries, such as Tamil and Telugu cinema. In ancient Indian tradition, the navel of Vishnu is considered to be the source of life and creativity. It is considered to be a symbol of birth and life. That means in ancient India, women would wear sari that bared their midriffs.

Indian television actors have followed suit, wearing saris that expose more skin, including the navel, with viewers mimicking the styles.

Some women wear navel jewels or navel piercings to emphasize the navel and enhance its appeal. For example, actress, Sreeleela, has done multiple item songs wearing dangling belly piercings. Another option is using bindis to decorate the navel. Tattoos near or below the navel were becoming popular in cities such as Pune in early 2012. Actresses Mandira Bedi and Chhavi Mittal are known for their unique tattoos on their navels.

Sometimes the low-rise style is modified, with the navel being covered by the pallu when wearing a low-rise non-transparent sari. In some corporations in India, saris are required to be worn in a manner that avoids navel exposure. Anita Gupta, Senior Vice-president at J. Walter Thompson in Chennai commented that formal wear for woman should not expose the navel.

=== Indian cinema ===
Indian actresses have expressed comfort with the practice of exposing their navels in film, preferring it to showing cleavage and calling it uncontroversial. Indian actresses like Rashmika Mandanna, Pooja Hegde, Shraddha Kapoor, Kiara Advani and Priyanka Arul Mohan are known for exposing their midriff and navel in sensual movie scenes.

==== Bollywood ====
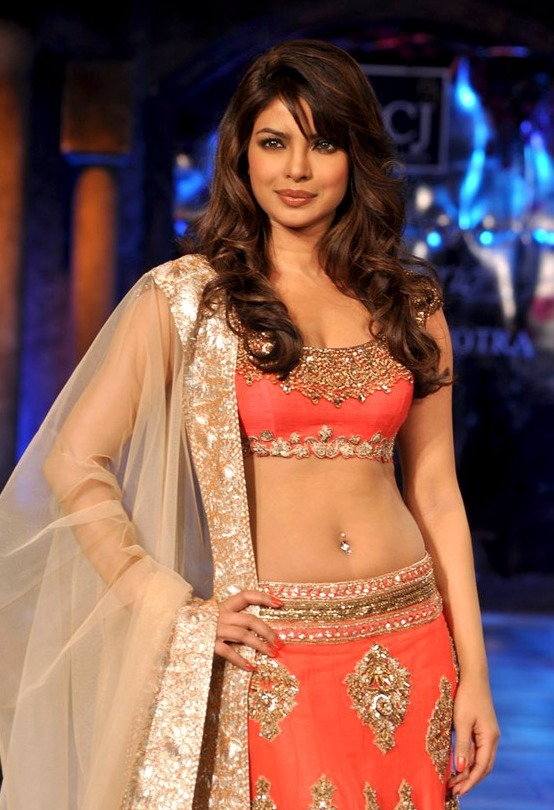
Priyanka Chopra on the ramp for Mijwan fashion show

Female dancers of Bollywood have always exposed their navels, since Amrapali (1966), with cameras focused on them. In the 1968 Bollywood film Brahmachari, actress Mumtaz was seen in a Sharara sari showing her navel for a song and dance number, "Aaj kal tere mere". A Sharara has a long blouse top with a unique divided skirt bottom, which has less flow than lehenga. It fits like a loose pant until reaching the knee, where it flares out. The particular style of sari became extremely popular and was dubbed the Mumtaz Sari. The 1981 film Ek Duuje Ke Liye, a remake of the 1978 Maro Charitra featured the replication of the "top spinning on the navel" scene with Rati Agnihotri. She had stated in an interview, "Today, when someone asks me how I balanced the top, I don't have an answer. Those days we didn't have monitors, the luxury of too many rehearsals or retakes. I did what was expected of me, telling myself it was like dramatics day in school, only instead of the stage I was facing a camera". The film Khalnayak (1993) was famous for the song "Choli ke Peeche" featuring Madhuri Dixit in navel-exposing attire. In the 2003 film Jism, actress Bipasha Basu appeared in a foreplay scene with an ice cube on her navel. Actress Aishwarya Rai showcased her navel in a brocade choli and dipped ghagra for the hit song "Kajra Re" in the film Bunty Aur Babli (2005). Katrina Kaif became famous for her dance performance showcasing her navel for the item number Sheila Ki Jawani for the 2010 film Tees Maar Khan. Film critic Baradwaj Rangan stated on his blog in a review for the film, "Katrina Kaif makes her entry in the well-shot, well-scored Sheela ki jawani song sequence, brandishing a belly button that seems to have a life of its own". For the 2011 film The Dirty Picture, actress Vidya Balan had acted in a scene where an egg put on her navel becomes an omelette. She stated in an interview, "It was difficult to control laughter and Milan used to wait to get me into the character because all this was part of the song and dance of those times to market the Silk phenomenon". Recently, Rakhi Sawant appeared in an item song "Latto Ghuma Re Chora" for the 2012 film Rakhtbeej in which a top is spun on her midriff and navel. She stated in an interview that the filming was painful since the director spun the sharp-pointed top 30 times on her midriff. Kareena Kapoor, Katrina Kaif, Deepika Padukone and Priyanka Chopra are the hottest navel and midriff exposing queens of Bollywood. They are also known as 'Fantastic Four' of Bollywood. Actress Richa Chadha had commented in an event that she was asked during a shoot to reveal her navel in high-waisted pants.

==== South Indian ====
South Indian actresses such as Trisha Krishnan, Shriya Saran, Ileana D'Cruz, Kajal Aggarwal, Taapsee Pannu, Shruti Hassan, Samantha Ruth Prabhu, Rashmika Mandanna, Priyanka Arul Mohan, Pooja Hegde, Mirnalini Ravi etc., are known for their navel exposure. Actresses such as Ileana D'Cruz, Tamannaah, Shriya Saran, Pooja Hegde etc., are known for exposing their slimmed-down midriffs in song sequences, while actresses such as Rashmika Mandanna and Priyanka Arul Mohan are known for exposing their below waist regions in movie sequences and songs.

===== Tamil cinema =====
During the 1990s, scenes focusing on the female protagonist's navel were common in Tamil cinema. Actress Sukanya became famous for a scene in the 1992 film Chinna Gounder, where the male protagonist spins a top on the female protagonist's navel. In 1996, actress Nagma became known for acting in a food play scene in the Tamil film Love Birds, which involves the male protagonist breaking an egg and cooking it on her navel, which was similar to a scene from Hot Shots! (1991) involving Valeria Golino.

In his review of Isai (2015), film critic Baradwaj Rangan stated that "Sulagna brings to mind the heroines of a certain era who were chosen not because they had beautiful eyes or a bewitching smile but because of the quiver-quotient of their navel when confronted by a close-up." Film critic Sudhir Srinivasan wrote in a review for the 2016 film Aranmanai 2, "The emphasis is not so much on making a horror story that is novel, than it is on fixating on the heroine's navel."

===== Telugu cinema =====
Of the South Indian film industries, Telugu cinema more frequently has actresses expose their navels. Film scholar Mahesh Kathi commented that Telugu cinema has a long history of "fondness for the navel", citing old South Indian temple architecture, which features numerous prominent displays of navels in their carvings, and calling such displays a "South Indian aesthetic sensibility". He continued, "Cinematically, while cleavage is just a peek at the bosom, the navel encompasses the woman's entire sensuality." The 1978 film Maro Charitra was the first to feature the scene where a top spins on the female protagonist's navel.

Veteran Telugu film director Kovelamudi Raghavendra Rao's movies always have guaranteed navel show of the heroines. He used to include the navel of the heroine in every possible frame and exploit it in song sequences such as dropping of water, flowers, fruits, ice cubes etc., on the navel. Prominent Telugu actor and director Dasari Narayana Rao had once commented, "When you see a heroine slightly removing her pallu to show her inside assets, you don't feel ashamed of it because of the artistic way in which Ragahvendra Rao projects it on the screen. Especially heroines' navels look most beautiful in his movies." Telugu actor and politician Chiranjeevi had commented in a TV show, "If you want to know about fruits, you have to do one film with director K. Raghavendra Rao. He used to put all the fruits around the heroine's navel (boddu)." In 2016, actress Pragya Jaiswal had requested Raghavendra Rao to have a shot with fruits and flowers on her navel as part of a song sequence. She told in an interview, "That's the third day of shooting with KRR sir and we're canning a song. But actually he's not making any flower or fruit thrown at my navel or waist, that's why I took courage to ask him to hit my navel with them."

The 2013 Telugu film Action 3D paid tribute to Raghavendra Rao with a song featuring his symbolic acts on the female protagonist's navel. A song sequence in the 2012 Telugu spoof film Sudigadu features the main protagonist dropping a watermelon and a pumpkin on the female protagonist's navel. Actress Monal Gajjar who has acted in the scene had commented on an interview, "When the hero throws it on my tummy I am supposed to scream with a strange sound and they told me they are not real, all are toy fruits."

Actress Rashmika Mandanna has played several scenes in which the protagonist sensually touches her bellybutton in order to fix her saree, leading up to intimate moments where the protagonist kneels down to lick her belly and Rashmika Mandanna removes her skirt to reveal her underwear. In the film Sarileru Neekevvaru, Rashmika Mandanna, being featured in an item song for the first time, also had several navel close-up shots, In the 2025 Bollywood movie Thamma, Rashmika Mandanna was also showcased with a cultural belly tattoo, where her character was shown to be wearing a crop-top throughout the film.

Actress Priyanka Arul Mohan was also shown lifting up her shirt to flaunt her belly to the protagonist in her 2024 'TikTok' movie.

==== Contradictions ====
The Censor Board of India for Indian cinema has created some limitations on "vulgar" visuals, such as restricting zoom shots of the navel, kissing the navel, and squeezing the navel and waist. These limitations had been implemented during the 1990s. Many films have faced censor cuts for navel scenes.

Many actors have expressed mixed views on the display of and emphasis of the navel. Some feel displaying the midriff or navel cannot be considered exposing when compared to Hollywood films. Actress Shilpa Shetty argued, "If navel-showing is obscenity, then our traditional Indian outfit—the traditional sari—should be banned in the first place." Actress, BJP member and CBFC member Jeevitha while speaking on item numbers stated, "Dance numbers are okay, but girls don't need to dress vulgarly. They can wear skirts but not too much below the navel." Telugu film director Krishna Vamsi commented, "All film-makers have problems with the censors. They sometimes object to showing the navel of a woman when, in other films, it is allowed. We cannot even question them. The censors should give us general rules in writing as to what is allowed and what is not, instead of taking decisions according to their whims and fancies." Actor R. Madhavan commented, "I have often been embarrassed to see certain films I have done. ... when I see myself kissing a dancing heroine's navel in some films, I feel ashamed." Actress Taapsee Pannu commented, "I believe the navel is overrated. I think sensuality can be expressed in other ways." Bengali actress Swastika Mukherjee said, "I am not very comfortable though I have tried wearing a lehenga choli with a stick-on in my navel." Many actresses have opted to hide their navels by wearing trikinis for beach or pool scenes.

== Japanese culture ==
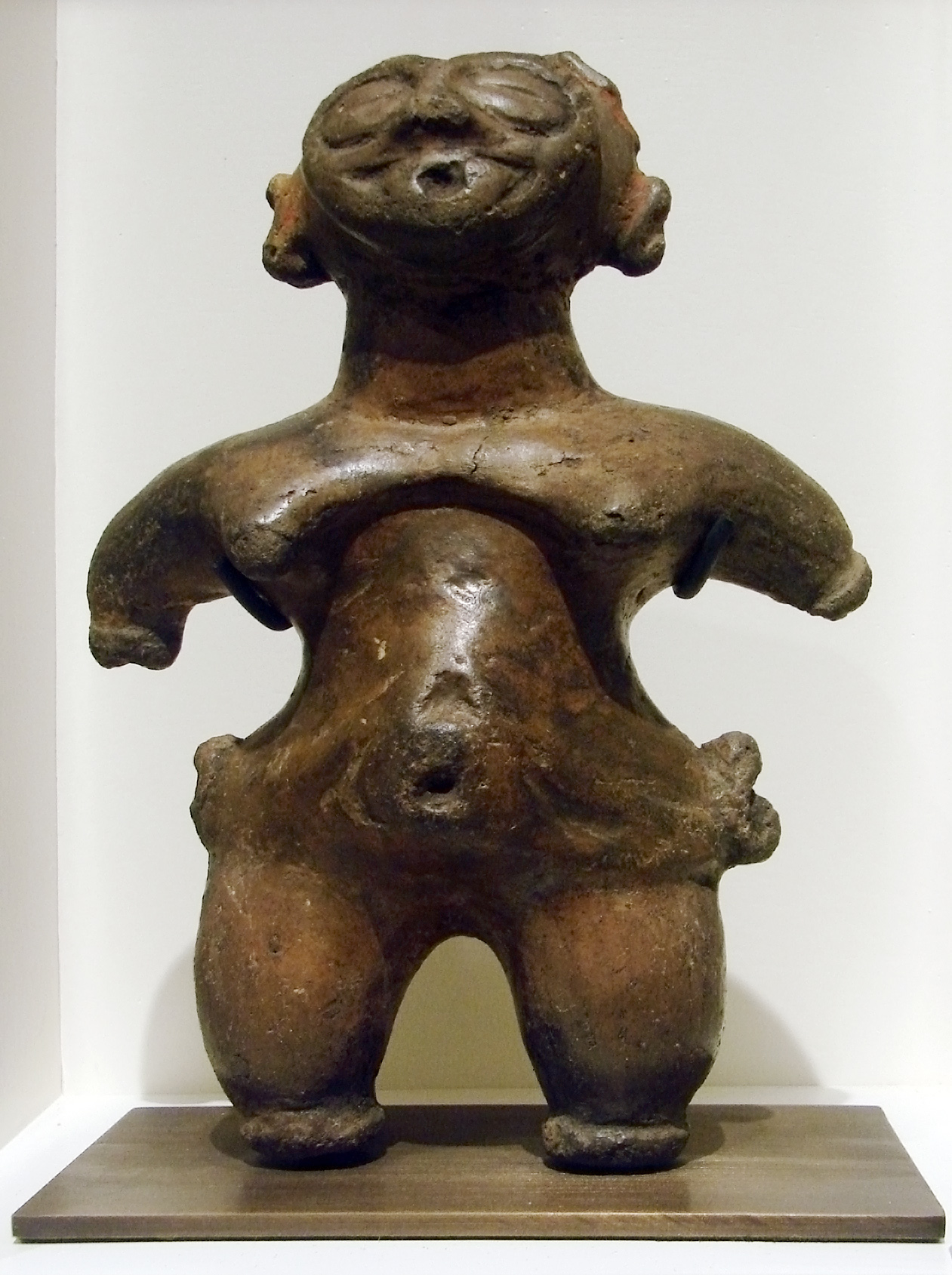
Dogū figurine of the late Jōmon period with the navel indicated with a deep indentation

=== Early times ===
Japan has long had a special regard for the navel. During the early Jōmon period in northern Japan, three small balls indicating the breasts and navel were pasted onto flat clay objects to represent the female body. The navel was exaggerated in size, informed by the belief that the navel symbolizes the center of where life begins. On many middle Jomon figurines, the significance of the navel was emphasized with an indentation or hole. Sometimes, the importance of the navel was further enhanced by connecting with a line from the navel towards the chest. Early Japanese poems feature many references to the female navel. In some, the word navel actually refers to an indentation or hole instead of the belly button. The shape of the umbilicus of a newborn baby would be discussed at length. If a baby's navel points downward, the parents would brace themselves for a weakling child who will bring them woe. The thunder god Raijin, with his terrifying drums, great horns, and long tusks, was said to have an insatiable appetite for young navels, and mothers had to nag their youngsters constantly to keep themselves well covered up. Due to the mythology, navel exposure was not encouraged in the earlier times. The traditional clothing of Japanese women has a wide cloth belt around the midriff to protect the belly and keep it warm.

=== Modern times ===
Although navel exposure has become a recent trend in fashion in Japan, annual Heso Matsuri ("belly button festivals") have been held in Japan since the late 1960s. The tradition of the Hokkaido Heso Odori ("belly button dance") began in 1968. Dancers make their heso ("belly button") into a face, using paint, special costumes, and props. Many variations of the dance have been developed, leading to competitions among dancers, who compete for prizes in various categories.

A similar type festival is held at Shibukawa, north of Tokyo. The idea was formed based on the location of Shibukawa, which is also referred to as the "Belly Button of Japan". The festival is based on a traditional Japanese form of entertainment where revelers paint a face on their torsos and stomachs to appear as a head. A kimono is wrapped around the waist, and the person's real head is hidden by a large cloth hat. The belly button is traditionally painted into a mouth. In recent years, modern motifs and Japanese anime designs have appeared in the festival.

== Sri Lankan culture ==
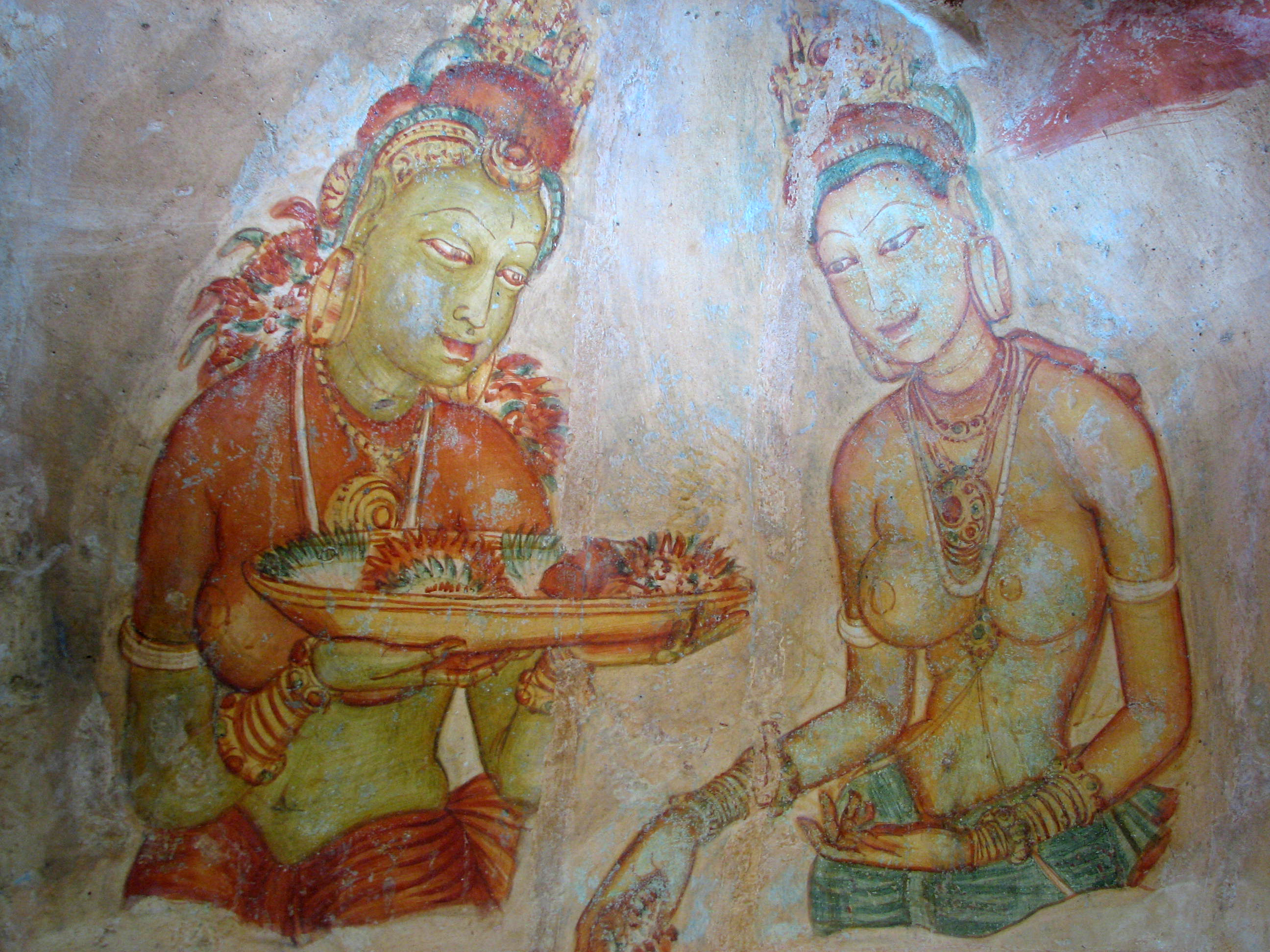
7th-century Sigiriya frescoes depicting women in navel-exposed attire

=== Ancient times ===
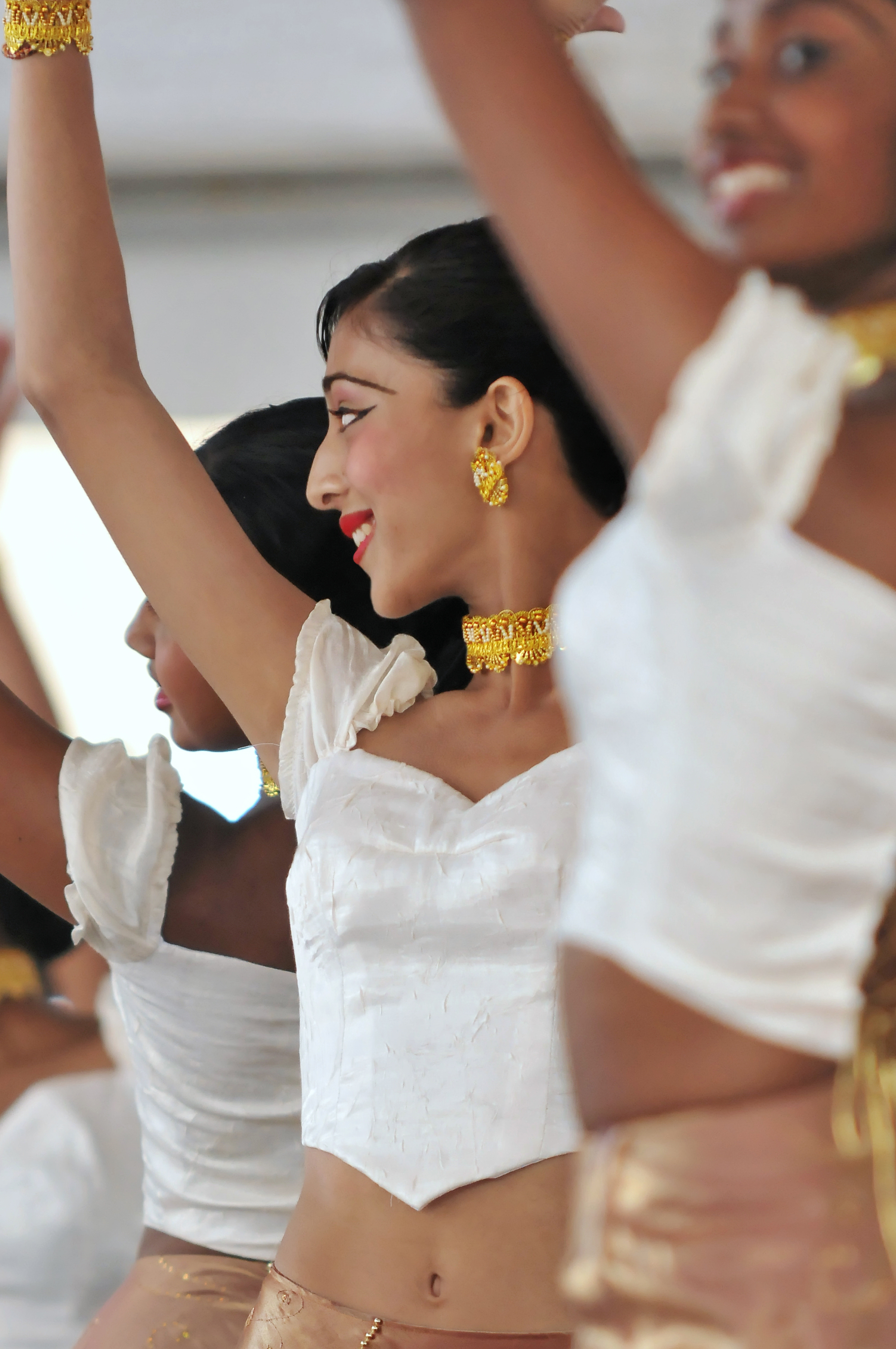
Sinhalese women performing a traditional Sri Lankan dance in navel-exposing attire

Sigiriya frescoes depict royal ladies wearing cloth draped as a dhoti, tied in a knot at the front and pulled down to expose the navel. They wear pleated robes from the waist upwards, as well a necklace, armlets, wristlets, ear and hair ornaments, and display their breasts. The ladies in waiting wear waist clothes, a few ornaments and a firm thanapatiya ("breast bandage").

In the Sinhalese poetic work Kaviyasekara, a father advises his married daughter as to proper clothing, "Dress your garment above your navel, without exposing the fair bosom, and expose not your teeth in laughing."

In his work Daily Code for the Laity (1898), the Buddhist leader Anagarika Dharmapala wrote that a sari blouse must be long, fully covering a woman's breasts, midriff, navel, and back.

=== Recent times ===
In the 1980s and 1990s, a visible navel was very rare. By the late 1990s, the Bollywood connection and the media and technological changes that occurred in India had influenced Sri Lanka's fashion outlook, with the navel becoming a focus in the modern Sri Lankan wardrobe. Sri Lankan films commonly depict the women of the country's earliest history as scantily clad with exposed navels, and the country has become more open to the topic in general. In Nov 2015, Western Province Chief Minister Isura Devapriya stated that a school dress code for students and teachers would be issued requiring that the navel be covered. However, the Ceylon Teachers Union President Joseph Stalin condemned it and commented, "We condemn this statement. It is an anachronistic proposal. We see nothing wrong with teachers wearing sarees below the belly button. It may be that there is something wrong with Mr. Devapriya’s eyesight. We like to ask the Chief Minister whether the belly button is the main concern facing the education sector in the Western Province".

== Indonesian culture ==
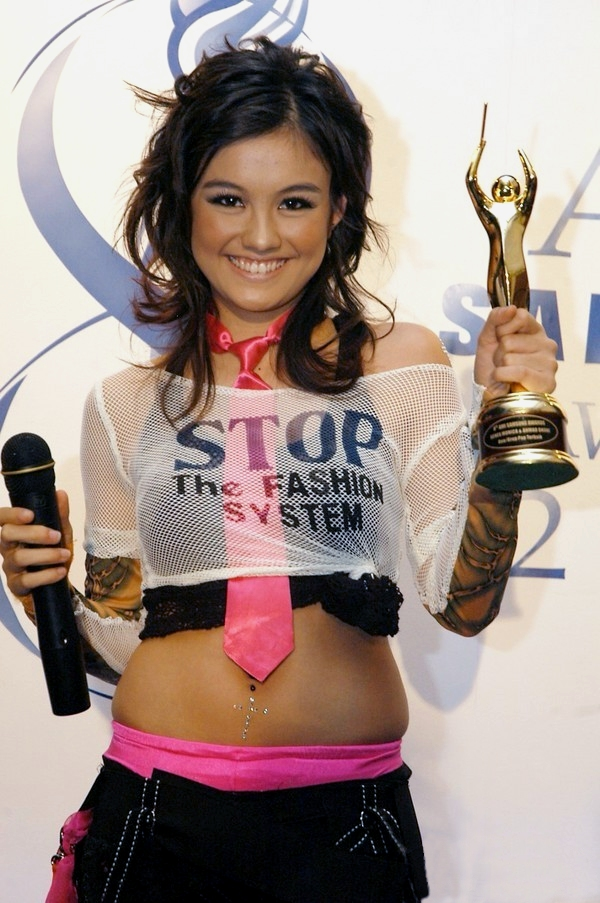
Agnez Mo in navel-exposing attire at the 2004 AMI Awards

In 2004, the President of Indonesia Susilo Bambang Yudhoyono spoke out against exposed navels, saying, "Indonesian women, who are known for their courtesy, should refrain from exposing their midriffs or belly buttons, which now seems to be taken for granted. There are many ways to express beauty, as part of aesthetics, and to express freedom but not by showing things that lead to pornography." He further added that while the state could not dictate dress codes, citizens were expected to respect the country's moral values and courtesy. A week later, a cabinet minister quoted Yudhoyono as saying that he felt "disturbed and uneasy" to see television shows in which women exposed their navels.

In 2006, Agus Suwage, an Indonesian artist, installed his Pinkswing Park exhibit at Jakarta's international biennale. The exhibit was surrounded by massive panels with multiple pictures of a near-naked man and woman frolicking in a park. Within days of the exhibition's launch, Islamic fundamentalists had descended on the biennale, forcing its closure and demanding prosecutions. At first police claimed his work blasphemed the story of Adam and Eve; a few weeks later they told Suwage he faced five years in jail for producing pornography. The Indonesian parliament decided to introduce a sweeping anti-pornography law. The law imposes a rigid social template; couples who kiss in public will face up to five years' jail, as would anyone flaunting a "sensual body part"—including their navel—and tight clothing will be outlawed. Due to this new anti-pornography law, topless bathing and surfing on the beaches of Bali, a common practice among tourists, would also be prohibited. The law would also affect older tribal women, who often still walk topless. The introduction of a bill was attacked by women's rights campaigners in the country, who fear it is the first step towards the implementation of Islamic Sharia law.

Despite these laws, pop singers such as Inul Daratista, known for her hip swaying moves, and Agnez Mo continue exposing their navels, but undergo some restrictions in advertisements.

== Korean culture ==
Traditionally, Korean women are expected to dress modestly. The traditional wear such as Hanbok cover the entire body.

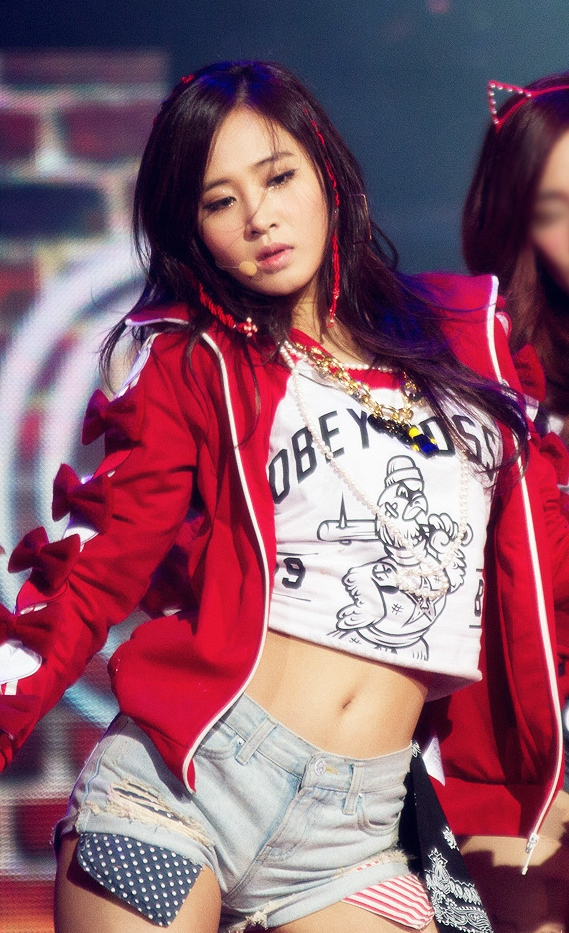
South Korean singer Yuri performing at KBS Hope Concert in January 2013

=== 1990s ===
During the 1990s, the fashion trend among young South Korean women for wearing cropped T-shirts that leave the midriff exposed had started, due to the hot climatic conditions. The trend spread to create changes in female fashion such that when a policeman in Gwangju arrested two young women for flaunting their belly buttons in the street, the judge threw the case out, ruling that the flashing of a female navel was not indecent. It further became popular due to Korean pop culture, where K-pop stars started wearing body piercings and midriff-exposing shirts. In July 1997, the South Korean broadcaster KBS announced tough new rules for pop stars appearing on TV. One among the many limitations was "no exposing of navels".

=== 2000s ===
During the 2000s, it became common among young women to expose their belly buttons by rolling up their shirts similar to a crop top. During sport events such as football, the female audience apply body paints or temporary tattoos around their belly buttons. In 2010, Korean girl group Rainbow's dance routine that involved lifting up their shirts to expose their navels became popular. The band stated in an interview, "We have to keep our abs in shape for the belly button dance." the routine was subsequently banned. The SBS TV show Inkigayo told girl groups to restrain showing their skin too much and about their outfits. In 2013, Yoona, a member of Korean girl band Girls' Generation, caused a minor controversy by revealing an exposed midriff featuring a protruding cantaloupe-like outie navel, which started a spirited discussion and polarized opinions on the Chinese-language internet.

Formal wear is expected to cover the stomach and belly button.

== Malaysian culture ==
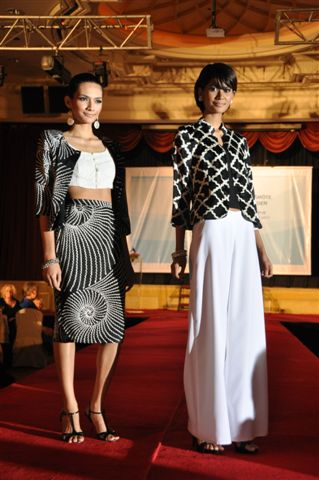
Malay models in attire that covers the navel at a fashion show in Kuala Lumpur in April 2011

In 2005, Vivienne, a virtual girlfriend created by software maker Artificial Life Inc. of Hong Kong, was reprogrammed not to bare her navel or display body piercings in conservative Muslim countries including Malaysia to avoid problems. In 2006, Nik Abdul Aziz Nik Mat gave his blessings to an Islamic form of dance clubs to serve as entertainment outlets at Kota Bharu. He commented that there must be proper attire for women, including clothes that do not reveal the navel, saying Muslim women must be covered from head to toe except for their face and hands, while Muslim men must be decently dressed when in public. Under Malaysian government rules for stage performances, a female artist must be covered from her shoulders to her knees. This law prevented pop icon Beyoncé Knowles from performing in navel-exposing attire in 2007. Beyoncé canceled the show amid opposition from local groups, calling the cancellation a result of a "scheduling conflict".

== Views in alternative medicine from antiquity ==
Saint Thomas Aquinas considered the navel as the "bodily metaphor for spiritual things".

=== Alternative medicine ===
Manipura chakra that represents the navel

=== Indian medicine ===
In Indian traditional medicine, the Cyperus rotundus tuber is made into a paste and applied around the navel to relieve pain caused by roundworms. Pomegranate plant juice and paste is used to treat snake bites; the juice is dropped into the nostrils, ears, and navel. Applying a little bit of ghee or mustard oil on cotton and keeping it on the navel overnight is considered a remedy for dry lips. Castor oil is applied to the navel of infants as a remedy for stomach aches. The Gonds, a tribe from central India, apply Gloriosa superba rhizome extract over the navel and vagina to induce childbirth and perform normal delivery.

According to Ayurveda, the navel is an important site in the human body. Nearly 72,000 subtle nerves, or nadis converge in this area. By the principles of Ayurveda and yoga, the human body is made up of six chakras, with the Manipura chakra located at the spine directly behind either the navel or the solar plexus, depending on the system, while its kshetram, or superficial activation point, is located directly on the navel and represents the element fire. Vayu or vital wind as specified in Ayurveda, is divided into five sub categories. Of these, Samāna Vayu, situated in the navel region, is believed to aid in digestion and give physical strength to the body.

According to Ayurvedic principles, navel displacement is a condition in which the navel center shifts. This might create digestive disorders. Proper practice of yoga is considered to be a remedy to realigning the navel.

=== Sri Lankan medicine ===
In Sri Lanka traditional medicine, a composition of herbs, powdered pepper, and water is applied as a paste to the navel as a remedy for stomach aches. During difficulties in delivery, a betel leaf is placed on the woman's navel, which is believed to be under a spell.

=== Russian medicine ===
Laying wormwood on the female navel or spreading a paste of reindeer lichen on the navel were considered by Russian women to make the delivery of a child fast and painless.

=== Chinese medicine ===
In the Chinese art of acupuncture, the navel is sometimes referred to as 神阙 (shénquè, roughly translating to divine imperfection or mark of the ancestors). Often, the navel is used as a moxibustion point. However, the navel itself is not used in acupuncture due to the likelihood of infection.

== See also ==
- Belly fetish
- Crop top
- Navel fetishism
- Toplessness
- Waistline (clothing)
