= Belly fetish =

Sexual attraction to the stomach or belly

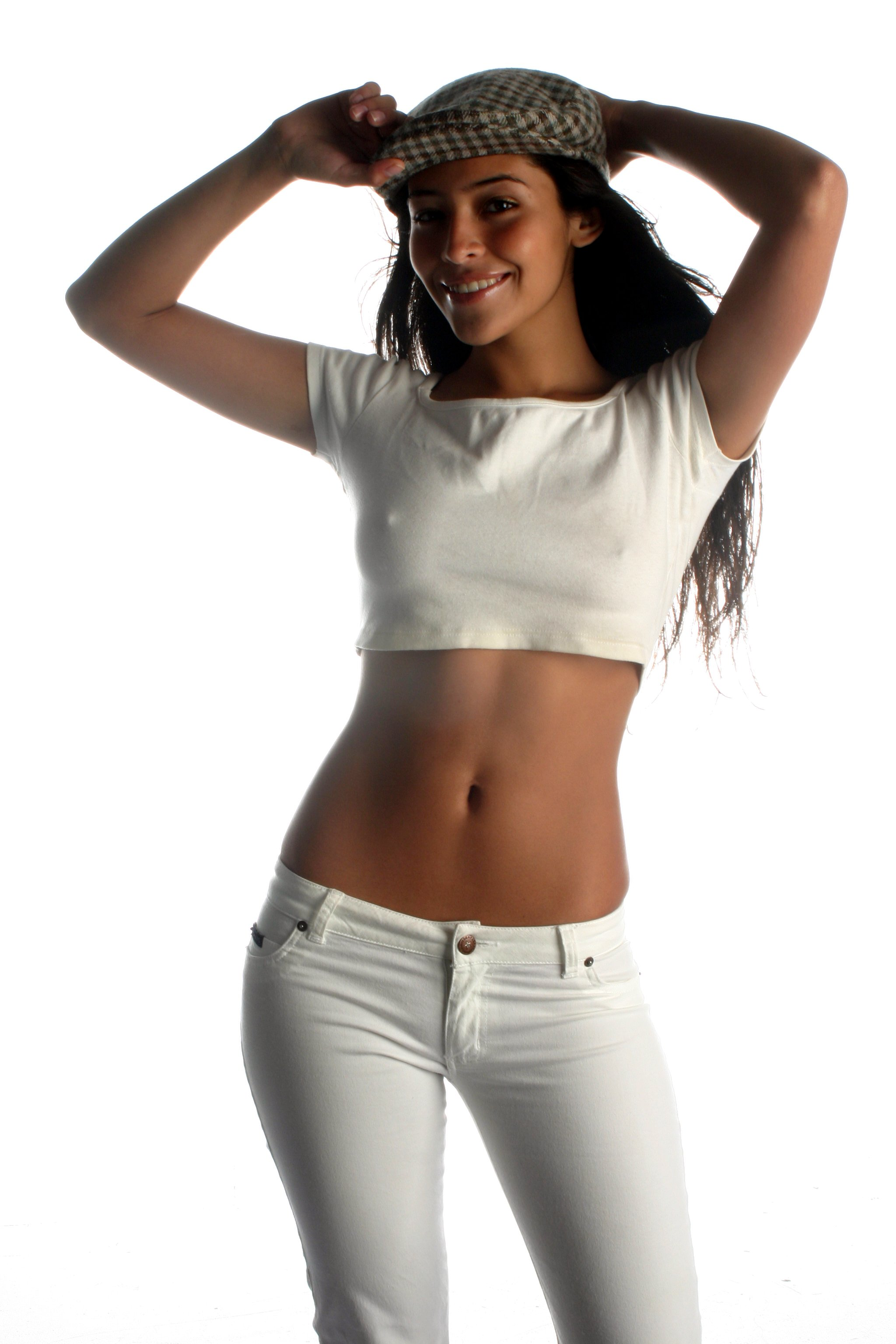
A woman wearing a crop top and low rise jeans, leaving her belly exposed

A belly fetish (also known as a stomach fetish, or alvinolagnia) is a partialism in which an individual is sexually attracted to the midriff or belly.

== Description ==
The belly is widely considered as an erogenous region, meaning it holds multiple nerve endings that make it sensitive to various sensations. Therefore, having a belly fetish usually coincides with belly-related sexual acts including but not limited to pressing a partner's belly, touching/rubbing the belly region, using sex toys and other objects (e.g., food, candles, ice, feathers, massage oils) to stimulate the belly region, rubbing one's belly against a partner's belly, or licking or sucking the navel. For this reason, belly fetishism (alvinolagnia) often co-exists with navel fetishism (alvinophilia).

=== Belly-to-belly contact ===
It is theorized that a sexual desire for belly-to-belly contact is linked to the evolutionary need for ventral-ventral contact when being nursed as an infant or to entice feelings of being nurtured and loved. One participant of a social experiment involving belly-to-belly contact described the act as "a very intimate thing, even when it's not meant to be."

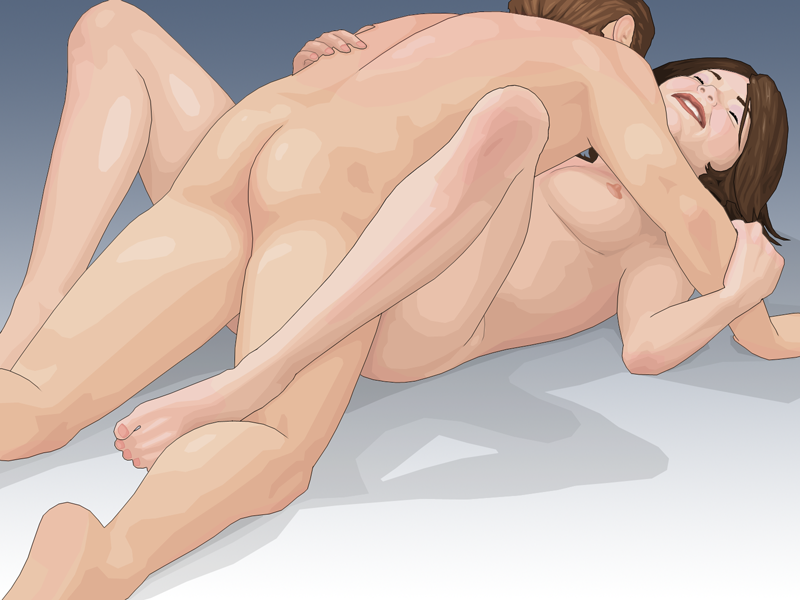
A couple demonstrating sexual belly-to-belly contact in the missionary position

==== Evolutionary perspective ====
The evolutionary need for ventral-ventral contact may also arise from the need for physical contact, which is critical for human development. This connection to early human development, where close physical contact is essential for survival, could explain why belly-to-belly contact remains comforting and desirable in the context of the paraphilia.

Belly-to-belly contact might also play a role in sexual selection, where close physical proximity and the sharing of warmth could be seen as indicators of a strong, nurturing partnership and the ability to provide nurturance to offspring. This contact, whether in sexual or non-sexual contexts, can strengthen interindividual bonds, contributing to a sense of security and mutual support.

==== Psychological and socioemotional perspective ====
For some, belly-to-belly contact can be a deeply sensory experience, evoking feelings of comfort, safety, and connection. The warmth and softness of this contact can be soothing and contribute to emotional regulation, much like how infants are calmed by close physical contact with their caregivers. In adult relationships, this contact can reinforce a sense of closeness and emotional intimacy, extending beyond romantic contexts to include friendships and family bonds.

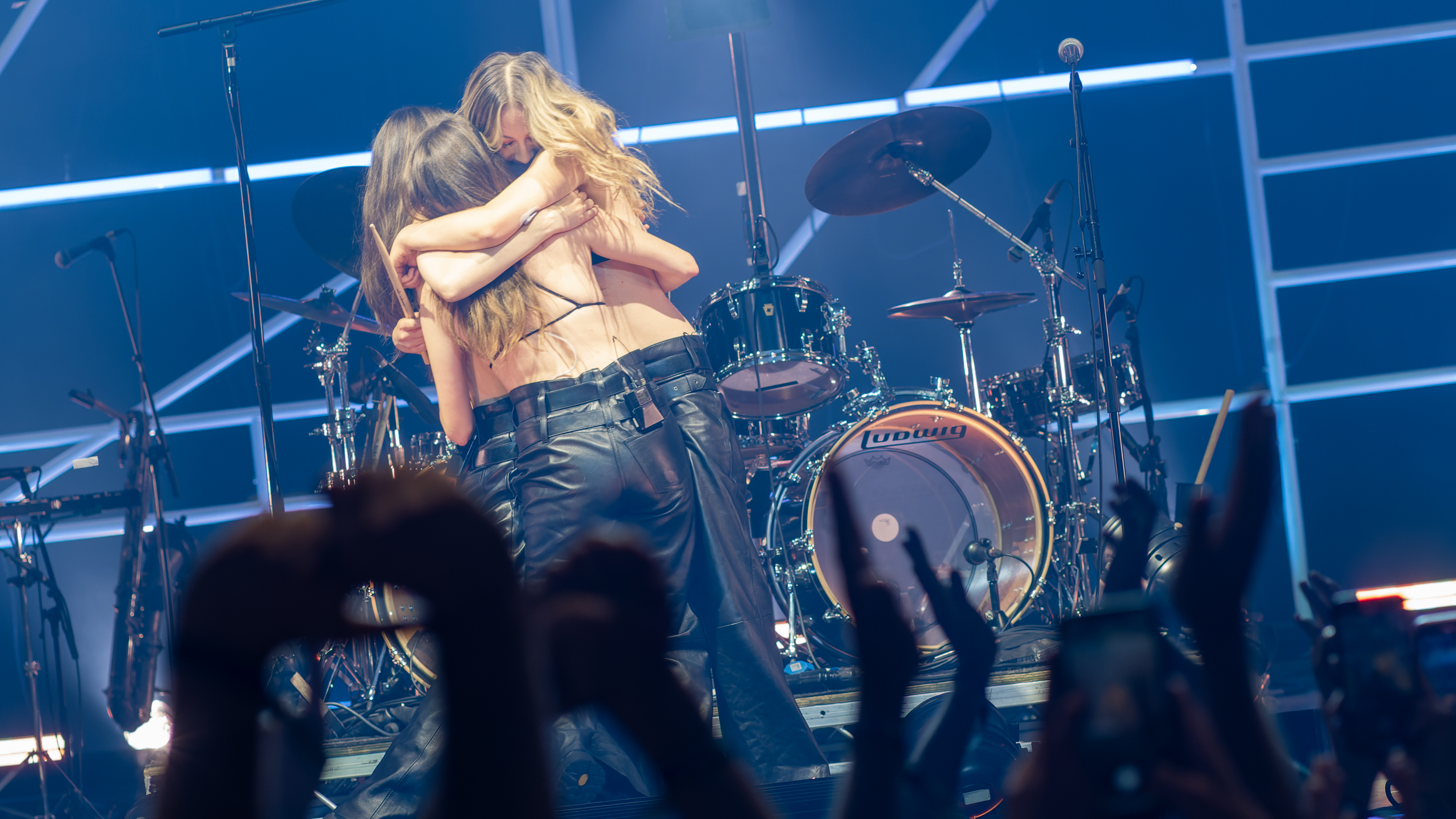
Band members wearing revealing clothing embracing post-concert, resulting in non-sexual belly-to-belly contact

These psychological undertones of ventral-ventral contact may also contribute to emotional and/or physiological arousal during objectively non-sexual belly-to-belly contact, which may happen when hugging or cuddling while wearing skin-revealing clothing (e.g., crop top, bikini); taking part in some forms of partnered dance (e.g., bachata, salsa, tango); or participating in sports involving belly-to-belly contact either due to the sports' nature (e.g., wrestling, mixed martial arts) or as a strategy for obtaining rest, breaking-up an opponent's rhythm, heightening camaraderie during play, and/or eliciting post-play celebration (e.g., boxing, beach volleyball).

==== Neuroscientific perspective ====
Belly-to-belly contact can stimulate release of oxytocin, the "bonding hormone," which plays a key role in forming social bonds, enhancing trust, and reducing stress. Touching sensitive areas like the belly further amplifies this "bonding" effect, as sensitive touch can stimulate neuronal firing in the brain's reward center, the nucleus accumbens (NAc). As a result, belly-to-belly contact neuropsychologically augments the emotional intimacy between two individuals.

NAc (Green), Sagittal Sections

Moreover, as the torso contains numerous vital organs, belly-to-belly contact stimulates pathways related to thermoregulation and homeostasis. A study of 51 newborns found that SSC with belly-to-belly touch was significantly more effective at regulating newborn body temperature and homeostasis than using radiant heat alone. Therefore, belly-to-belly contact may help calm the autonomic nervous system, reducing anxiety and promoting relaxation.

== Cultural background ==
=== Western culture ===
Some assume that alvinolagnia is a cause of the prevalent western fashion of female midriff exposure. In the Victorian era, a small waist was considered the main trait of a beautiful woman. The advent of bikinis in 1946, the cheerleading fashion of the 1970s and low-rise fashion started in the early 1990s have contributed to widespread fascination of the belly region. Specific breakthroughs of the belly region being featured in American media include Cher in the 1970s The Sonny & Cher Comedy Hour, as well as the character Ariel in Disney's The Little Mermaid. Midriff exposure also became common in the culture of 20th-century music with many famous female pop stars appearing on and offstage and in music videos with their midriff exposed. Some get attracted to women wearing a crop top or bikini.

Despite the prevalence of alvinolagnia, midriff exposure, and sexual belly-to-belly contact throughout Western pop culture, it is rare for belly-to-belly contact to be featured in Western media under a non-sexual tone. Nonetheless, non-sexual belly-to-belly contact in Western media generally represents either the establishment of a non-sexual friendship or the strengthening of an existing bond between two people.

=== Middle Eastern culture ===
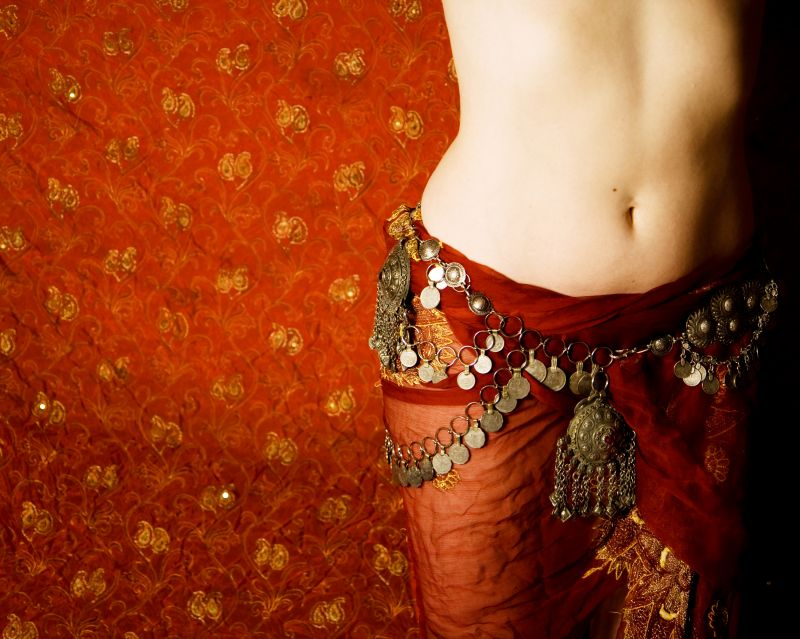
Belly dancing movements are considered to be seductive.

The eastern art of belly dancing places the female midriff on center stage. The dance movements of the torso are considered to be seductive.

=== Indian culture ===
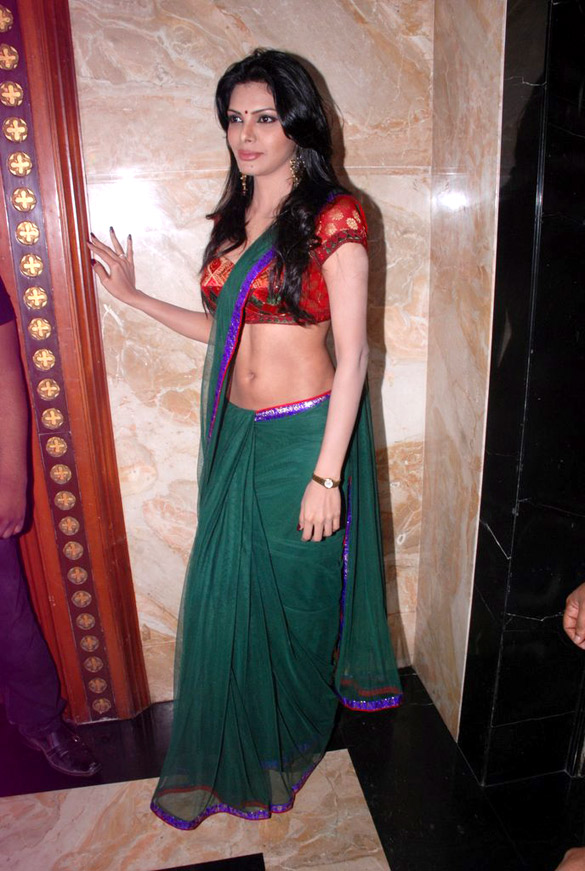
The exposure of midriff and navel in a sari. (In image: Sherlyn Chopra.)

The bare female midriff is considered attractive and erotic in India. Baring the midriff has always been a fashion in Indian women attire. Indian women have traditionally worn saris that bares the midriff, especially South Indian women. The exposure of midriff in a sari is considered to be erotic. The midriff is revealed in other traditional female attires like Ghagra choli. Belly chains known as kamarband in India when worn with low-rise saris and lehengas are considered sensuous. Most Indian women wear belly chains during weddings and other ceremonies as a show of culture and tradition. Nowadays, women have been pairing these chains with western outfits, mostly to draw attention to their figures.

Other parties may draw attention to demure floor-length attire and displays of a bare midriff. Indian actress Ileana D'Cruz had commented that there were shots where a big porcelain seashell was thrown on her belly and flowers decorated around her waist during the shoot of her debut film and stated that the belly and navel is supposed to be a mark of a woman's beauty in South Indian films and they believe that the waist line is the most attractive part. Actress Rashmika Mandanna has played several scenes wearing low rise jeans, revealing her navel to sensually entice the protagonist, quoting in an interview "I would say the navel is the hottest region of a woman's body...I perhaps enjoy revealing my belly". Indian singer Chinmayi once tweeted against a fan's request for saris during performances, saying, "Groups of men [...] take photographs of my waist + side of my chest, circle it and upload it on soft porn websites", adding that she "get[s] messages on how they're masturbating to it".

Another reported manifestation of alvinolagnia in India is arousal from pinching a woman on her midriff bared by the sari.

=== Accessories and tattoos ===
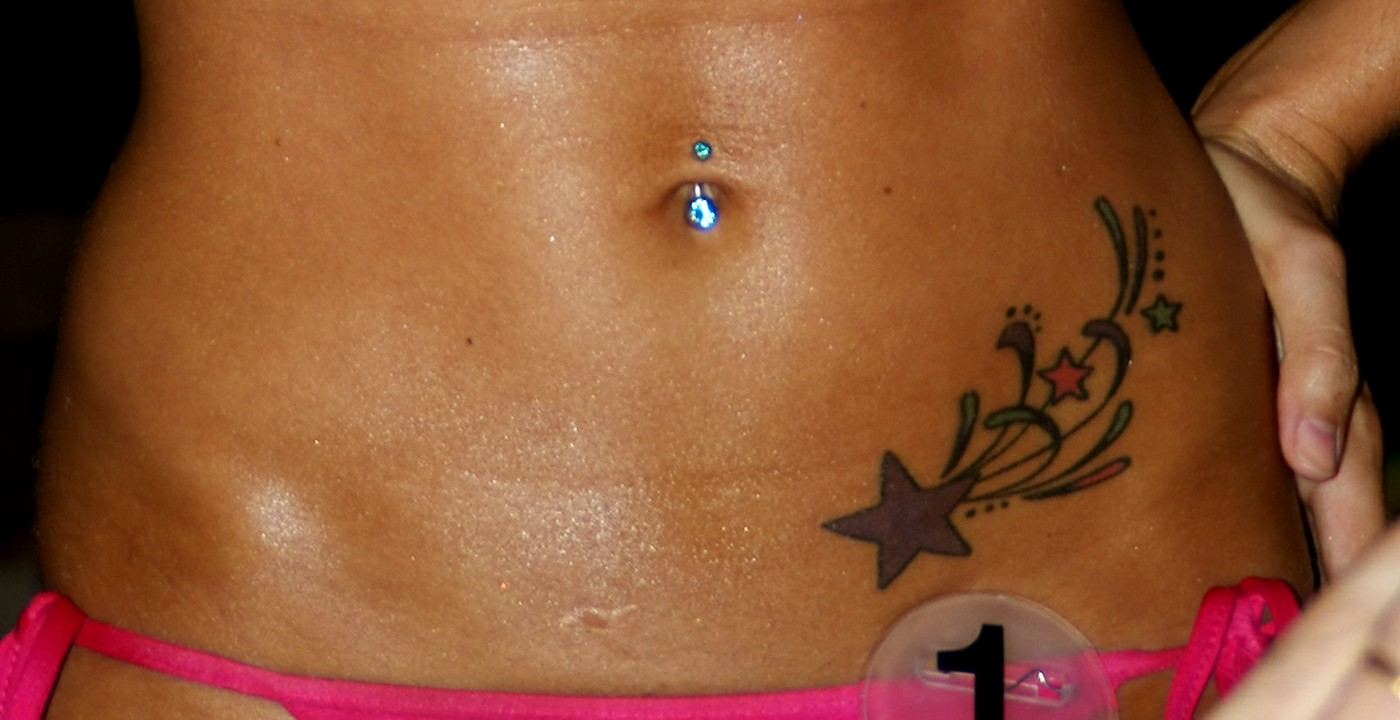
Woman with a navel piercing and a tattoo.

Some people wear accessories like belly chains, navel piercings, and tattoos to enhance the appearance of the belly. It can be a delicate thin or heavy thick chain.

Navel piercing and navel tattoos have become more common among young women. The trend of piercing or tattooing the navel became popular in the 1990s. It is popular among middle-aged women. Some belly chains attach to a navel piercing; they are called "pierced belly chains". Similar to navel piercings, hip piercings are also popular among women to express a bold personality.

Sometimes, looser clothing such as scarves or skirts around the female waist and curves can be seen as sexually appealing. Scarves wrapped around the waist are common among belly dancers.

== See also ==
- Cultural views on the midriff and navel
- Navel fetishism, which fetishizes the navel region of the belly
- Vorarephilia, which fetishizes being inside of the belly
