= Breast fetishism =

Sexual interest focused on female breasts

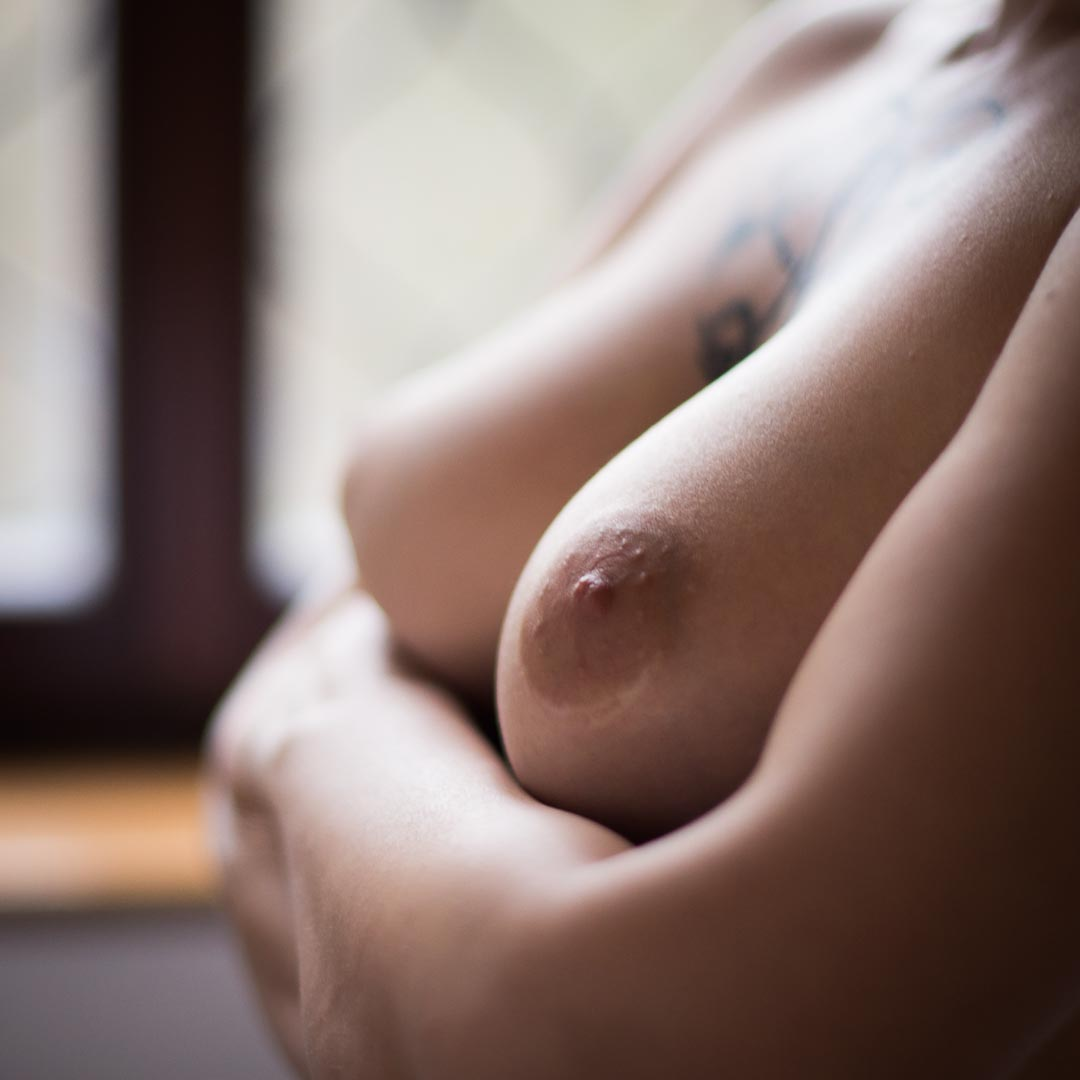
An image focusing on female breasts

As a paraphilia, breast fetishism (also known as mastophilia, breast partialism, or mazophilia) is a sexual interest that focuses exclusively on the female breasts, and is a type of partialism. The term breast fetishism is also used in the non-paraphilic sense, to refer to cultural attention to female breasts and the sexuality they represent.

Scientists hypothesize that non-paraphilic sexual attraction to breasts is the result of their function as a secondary sex characteristic. The breasts play roles in both sexual pleasure and reproduction.

Some authors have discussed the modern widespread fascination with breasts among heterosexual males in Western societies, especially in the United States, within the context of sexual fetishism.

== Scientific explanation ==
Scientists hypothesize that non-paraphilic sexual attraction to breasts is the result of their function as a secondary sex characteristic. The breasts play roles in both sexual pleasure and reproduction. Heterosexual males typically find female breasts attractive and this holds true for a variety of cultures.

Zoologist and ethologist Desmond Morris theorizes that cleavage is a sexual signal that imitates the image of the cleft between the buttocks, which according to Morris in The Naked Ape is also unique to humans, other primates as a rule having much flatter buttocks. Evolutionary psychologists theorize that humans' permanently enlarged breasts, in contrast to other primates' breasts, which only enlarge during ovulation, allows human females to "solicit [human] male attention and investment even when they are not really fertile". Research has also shown that women with larger and more symmetrical breasts have higher levels of fertility.

Sexual attraction to breasts is considered normal unless it is exclusive and is therefore a form of partialism.

== Society and culture ==
=== General ===
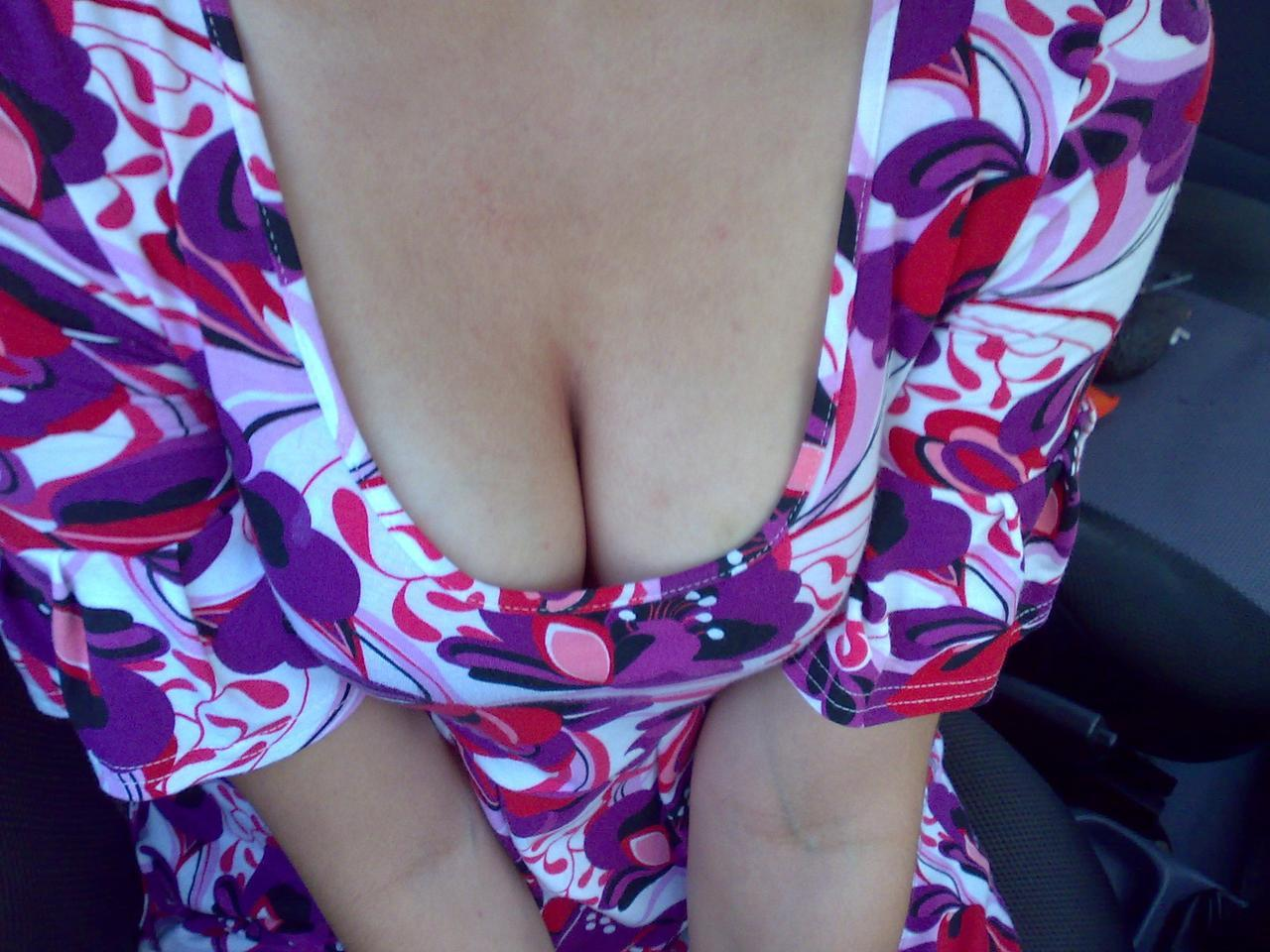
A woman wearing clothing displaying cleavage

There is a widespread fascination with women's breasts, and especially their size. Many people, both male and female, consider breasts an important female secondary sex characteristic.

Modern female fashions which focus on tight clothing and the display of cleavage have been attributed to an increase in breast fetishism. Display of cleavage with a low neckline is often regarded as a form of feminine flirting or seduction, as well as aesthetic or erotic. Most heterosexual men derive erotic pleasure from seeing a woman's breasts, and some people derive pleasure in their female partner exposing cleavage. When cleavage is enhanced with a push-up bra or exposed by a low neckline, it may draw attention. There are differences of opinion as to how much cleavage exposure is acceptable in public. The extent to which a woman may expose her breasts depends on social and cultural context. Displaying cleavage or any part of female breast may be considered inappropriate or even prohibited by dress codes in some settings, such as workplaces, churches, and schools, while in some spaces showing as much cleavage as possible can be permissible or even encouraged. The exposure of nipples or areolae is almost always considered toplessness, considered by some to be immodest and in some instances as lewd or indecent behavior. Art historian James Laver argued that the changing standards of revealing cleavage are more prominent in evening wear than in day wear in the Western world.

Film producers such as Russ Meyer produced films which featured actresses with large breasts. Lorna (1964) was the first of his films where the lead actress, Lorna Maitland, was selected on the basis of breast size. Other large-breasted actresses used by Meyer include Kitten Natividad, Erica Gavin, Tura Satana, and Uschi Digard. Most were naturally large-breasted; Meyer occasionally cast women in their first trimesters of pregnancy to enhance their breast size even further. Author and director William Rotsler said, "With Lorna Meyer established the formula that made him rich and famous, the formula of people filmed at top hate, top lust, top heavy."

With regard to pornography, according to statistics from the websites Pornhub and YouPorn, preference for either breasts or the buttocks varies between countries and, on average, between world regions; the United States and most of Latin America and Africa is in the buttocks group, and most of Europe and much of Asia is in the breasts group.

In the largest study of its kind, a 2020 survey of over 18,000 women from 40 countries found that 70 percent of participants were dissatisfied with their breast size, with nearly half of women (47 percent) wanting larger breasts and only 23 percent desiring smaller breasts. The researchers noted that "mean ideal breast size ratings were higher than mean current breast size ratings in the vast majority that we sampled..."

=== Alternative opinions ===
The term breast fetishism is also used within ethnographic and feminist contexts to describe a society with a culture devoted to breasts, usually as sexual objects. Some feminists have argued that incidents of breast fetishism have been found going back to the Neolithic era, with the goddess shrines of Çatalhöyük (in modern Turkey). The archaeological excavations of the town in c. 1960 revealed the walls of the shrine(s) adorned with disembodied pairs of breasts that appeared to have "an existence of their own". Elizabeth Gould Davis argues that breasts (along with phalluses) were revered by the women of Çatalhöyük as instruments of motherhood, but it was after what she describes as a patriarchal revolution – when men had appropriated both phallus worship and "the breast fetish" for themselves – that these organs "acquired the erotic significance with which they are now endowed".

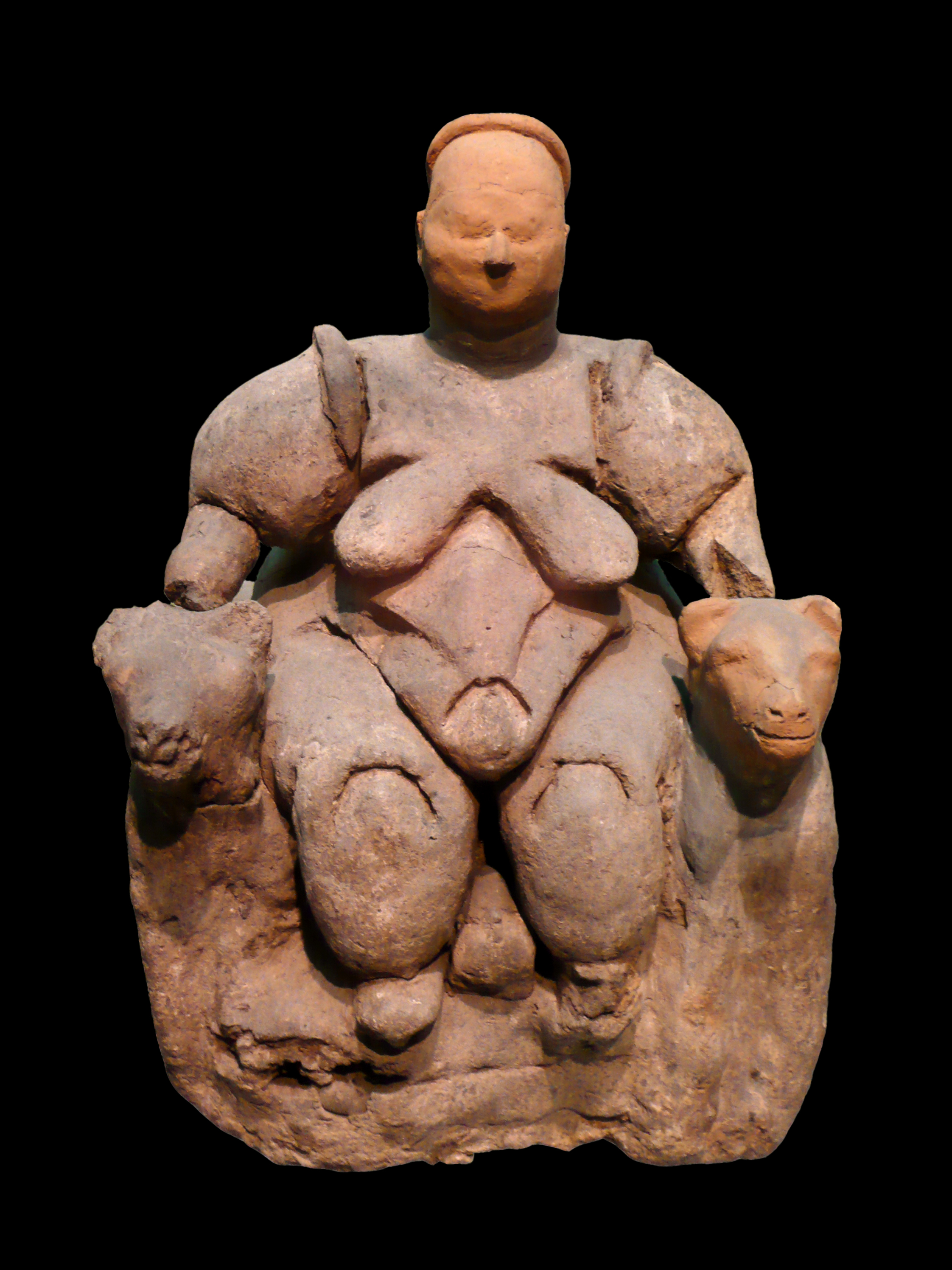
Seated woman of Çatalhöyük

Some authors from the United States have discussed attraction to female breasts within the context of sexual fetishism, and have stated that it is the American fetish-object of choice, or that breast fetishism is predominantly found in the United States. Other researchers have found that, as of 2020, "the objectification of medium-to-large breasts is now a global phenomenon, including in parts of the world that may have historically de-emphasised breast aesthetics..." In Patterns of Sexual Behavior, a 1951 analysis of 191 traditional cultures, the researchers noted that stimulation of the female breast by the male before sex "seemed absent in all subhuman forms, although it is common among the members of many different human societies."

=== Motorboating ===
A form of breast fetishism where a person places their face into the cleavage between a woman's breasts and moves it from side-to-side is known as motorboating. The person performing the act may also make the sound of a motorboat, from which the name is derived. This act can also be performed in reverse with the woman placing another person's face in between her breasts and moving them from side to side.

== See also ==
- Bakunyū – a genre of pornographic anime and manga depicting women with large breasts
- Breast augmentation
- Breast bondage
- Breast torture
- Erotic lactation
- Mammary intercourse

== Sources ==
- Glazier, Stephen D.; Flowerday, Charles (2003). Selected Readings in the Anthropology of Religion: Theoretical and Methodological Essays. Greenwood Publishing Group. ISBN 978-0-313-30090-5.
- Latteier, Carolyn (1998). Breasts: The Women's Perspective on an American Obsession. Haworth Press. ISBN 978-0-7890-0422-2.
