= Partialism =

Sexual desire toward non-sexual anatomy

Partialism is a sexual fetish with a focus on any other specific parts of the body other than the genitals. Partialism is categorized as a fetishistic disorder in the DSM-5 of the American Psychiatric Association only if it causes significant psychosocial distress for the person or has detrimental effects on important areas of their life. In the DSM-IV, it was considered a separate paraphilia (not otherwise specified), but was merged into fetishistic disorder by the DSM-5. Individuals who exhibit partialism sometimes describe the anatomy of interest to them as having equal or greater erotic attraction for them than do the genitals.

== Types ==
The following are some of the partialisms commonly found among people:

Formal name	Common name	Source of arousal
Podophilia	Foot/feet fetish	Foot
Oculophilia	Eye fetish	Eye
Maschalagnia	Armpits fetish	Armpit
Retrophilia	Back fetish	Back
Mazophilia	Breasts fetish	Breast
Pygophilia	Buttocks fetish	Buttock
Nasophilia	Nose fetish	Nose
Trichophilia	Hair fetish	Hair
Alvinophilia	Navel/belly button fetish	Navel
Alvinolagnia	Belly/stomach fetish	Belly
Cheirophilia	Hand/hands fetish	Hand
Crurophilia	Leg/legs fetish	Leg
Orisophilia	Lip/lips fetish	Lip
Glossophilia	Tongue fetish	Tongue
Odontophilia	Teeth fetish	Teeth
Otophilia	Ear/ears fetish	Ear
Buccalagnia	Cheek/cheeks fetish	Facial cheek
Erogonophilia	Dimple/dimples fetish	Dimple
Caudaphilia	Tail fetish	Tail

== See also ==
- Body worship
- Erogenous zone
