= Navel fetishism =

Sexual interest focused on the navel

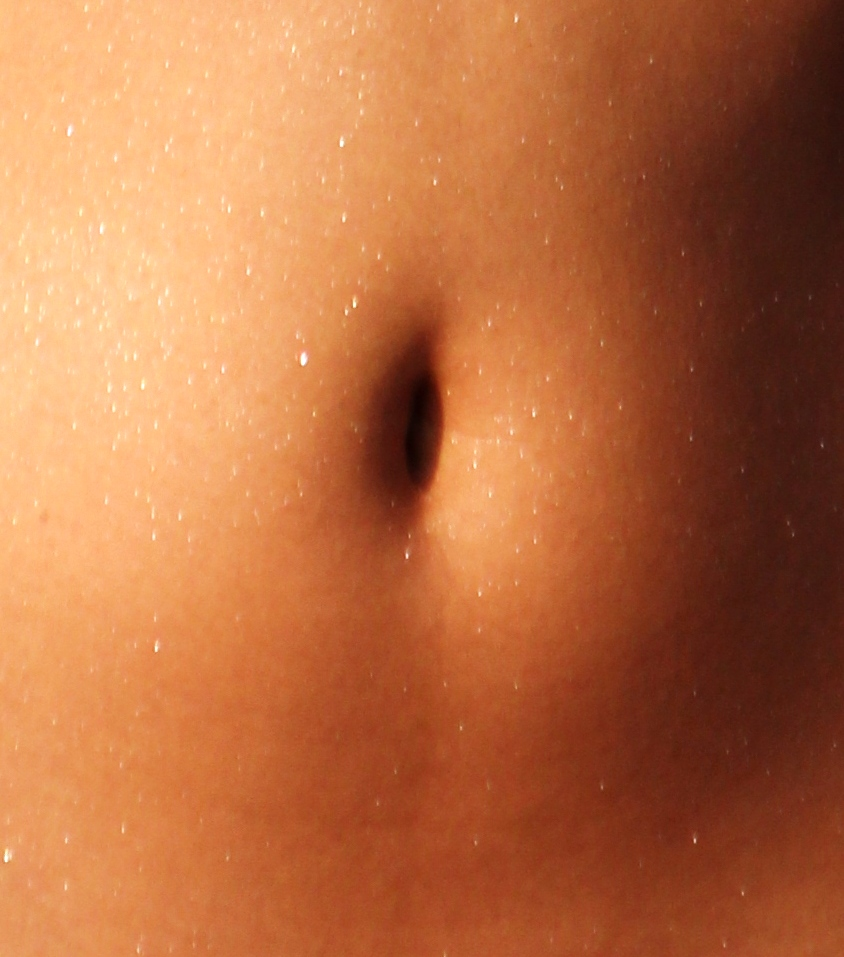
Closeup of a female navel

Navel fetishism, belly button fetishism, or alvinophilia is a partialism in which an individual is attracted to the human navel.

== Stimuli ==
A navel fetishist can be sexually aroused by a variety of stimuli, including keywords, thoughts, or specific forms of physical interaction with the navel.

=== Physical activity ===
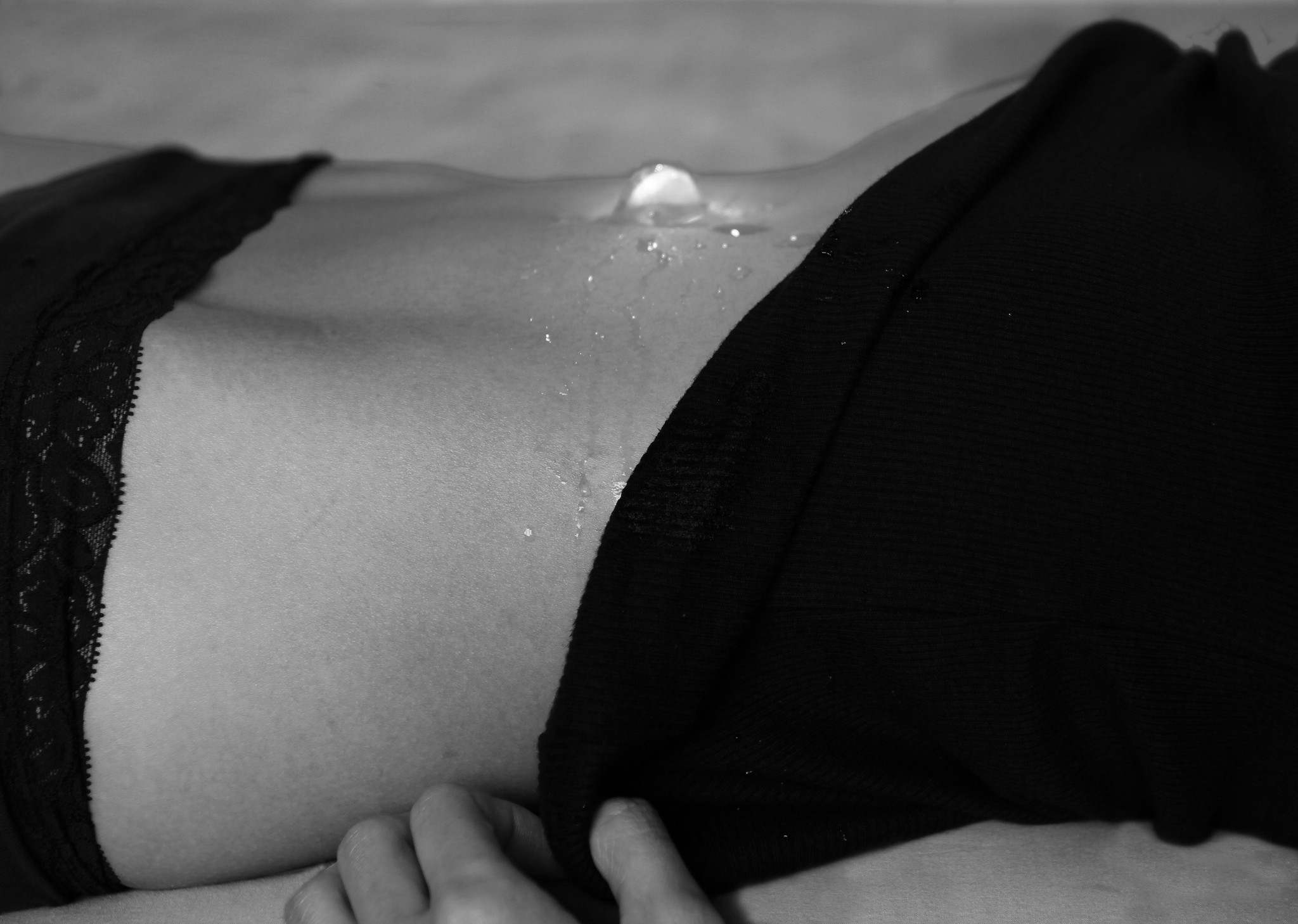
Ice on the navel region can produce erotic sensations.

The navel region is an erogenous zone with heightened sensitivity that when touched by the finger or the tip of the tongue can produce erotic sensations. Individuals who are ticklish in that area can be aroused by tickling, blowing raspberries, or being teased with a feather, flower, or blade of grass. Fingering the navel is also a common act.

Some navel fetishists find physical acts involving the navel to be sexually arousing. These physical acts can include licking the navel; applying body lotion or suntan oil; and pouring substances like champagne, honey, chocolate sauce or whipped cream into and around the navel and licking or sucking it up. Similarly, licking or rolling the tongue into the navel while underwater can produce erotic sensations, as can an ice cube when rubbed over or rested over the navel.

Some prefer to perform navel torture, a series of pain-inflicting acts such as sucking or pulling the navel out (often with a syringe), dripping hot oil or wax into the navel, poking pins into the navel, and stabbing the navel.

This attention is usually directed at a partner's navel, but may include a fixation on the fetishist's own navel.

=== Viewing and fantasizing activity ===
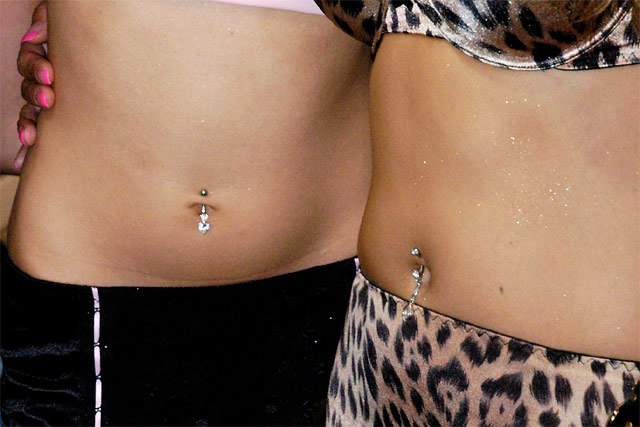
Some young women will get a navel piercing as a fashion statement.

Some navel fetishists can be aroused by viewing a navel. In the case of a heterosexual man, a woman in a bikini or low-rise clothing that reveals the navel is also considered sexually arousing.

Videos featuring above said physical acts are very common and are viewed worldwide. Their popularity has become more compared to regular porn videos.

Belly dancers often have navel piercings or insert sequins into their navels to make it look attractive when they perform. Not only them, many young everyday women also have them to add a charm to their navels. Such decorations also arouse when seen.

Some navel fetishists sexually fantasize about the above physical acts on a person's navel to attain sexual pleasure.

=== Literature ===
Sometimes, literary works focusing on navels or that sexually symbolize navels can also act as stimuli to navel fetishists. One such work is Navel Revue by author Jay Hahn-Lonne which is an autobiographical study of a man's obsession with navels. In the Song of Songs, a book in the Hebrew Bible, there are allusions to exotic things in nature, with frequent interweaving of nature with erotic imagery. In Solomon's lavish praise of his love – the country girl, Sulaimi – the navel is mentioned as follows: "thy navel is like a round goblet, which wanteth not liquor: thy belly is like a heap of wheat set about with lilies." (7:2).

American poet May Swenson in her poem "Little Lion Face" wrote, "Now I'm bold to touch your swollen neck, put careful lips to slick petals, snuff up gold pollen in your navel cup." and poem "August Night" wrote, "Your navel a little pool in pulsing tide an aura round your knees".

Czech-born writer Milan Kundera in his 2015 book The Festival of Insignificance conveys about the eroticism of exposed female navels. Alain, one of the characters in the book, observes to his friend how most of the young women in Paris wear T-shirts or blouses that expose their midriffs, displaying their navels for all to see. The navel has become, in effect, the new locus of desire.

Robert W. Service in his short poem "Navels" wrote, "Men have navels more or less;....Woman's is a pearly ring,....So dear ladies, recognise The dimpling of your waist Has approval in my eyes, Favour in my taste......How a rosebud navel would Be sweet to kiss!" In Ancient Indian Sanskrit literature, writers like Adi Shankara, Kālidāsa, etc., have symbolized and referred to the navel while describing the beauty of Hindu goddesses.

=== Erotica ===
In 1970, the short-lived Belly Button Magazine, of which only two issues were recovered by The Kinsey Institute, featured descriptions of penetrative navel intercourse and images of sexual acts directed at navels.

== Connections to other fetishes ==
Navel fetishism can co-exist with stomach fetishism (alvinolagnia) or sadomasochistic acts such as navel torture. Navel intercourse is commonly linked to weight-related fetishes like Big Beautiful Woman, feederism, and belly expansion.

== See also ==
- Belly fetish
- Clothing
  - Crop top
  - Lingerie
  - Low-rise pants
- Cultural views on the midriff and navel
- Omphalomancy – method of divination based on the shape of the navel
- Umbilicoplasty – plastic surgery to modify the navel
