= Muffin top =

Body fat hanging over the waistline of pants or skirts

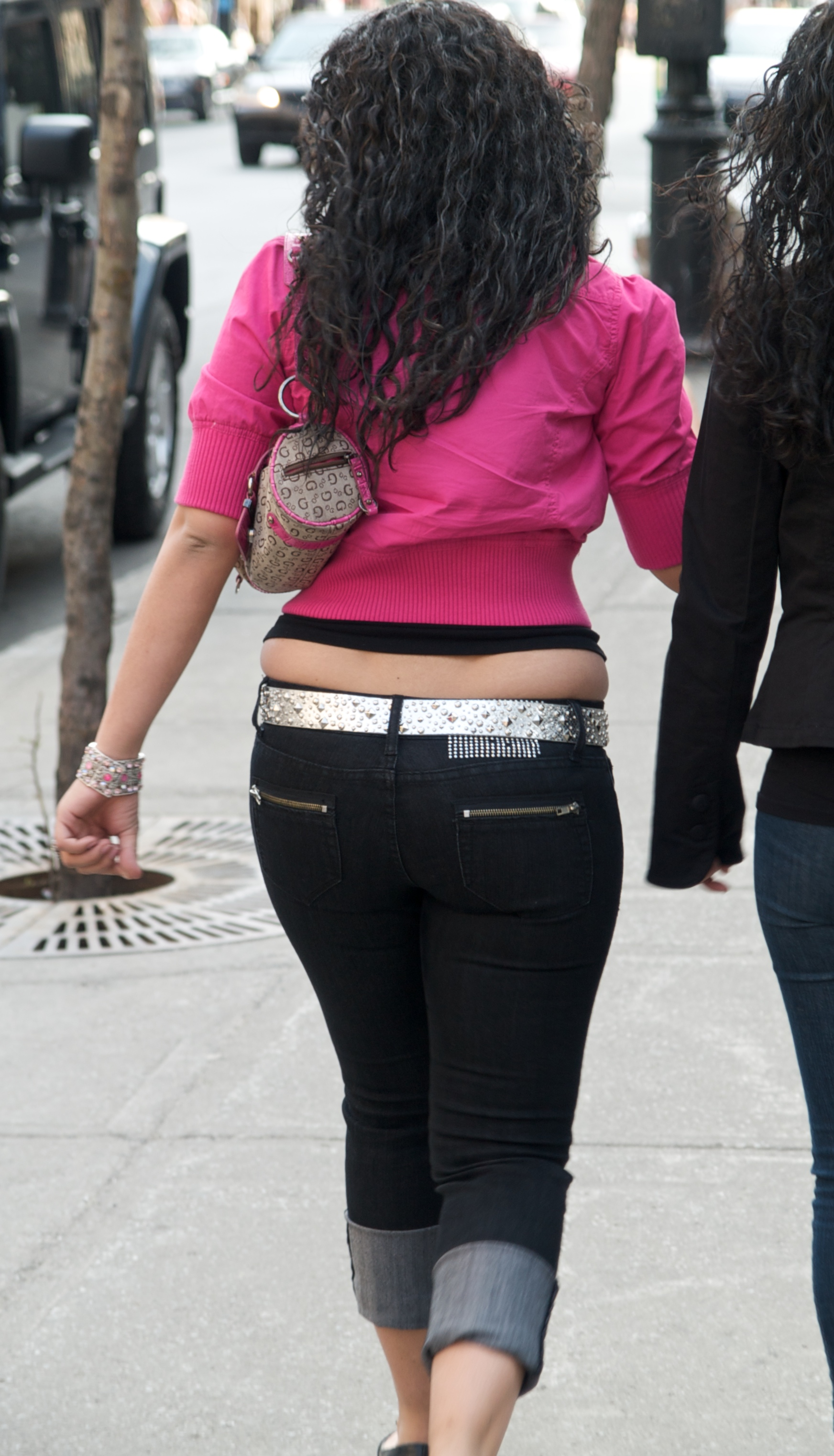
Muffin top visible at waist of a woman walking

A muffin top (also muffin-top) is a slang term typically used to describe a person's body fat that extends horizontally over the edges of the waistline of tightly fitting pants or skirts, visible when there is a gap between the upper and lower garment. The term is a reference to the way a muffin appears when it has been baked in a muffin tin, so that the top of the muffin extends horizontally over and around the top of the tin or casing.

== Origin ==
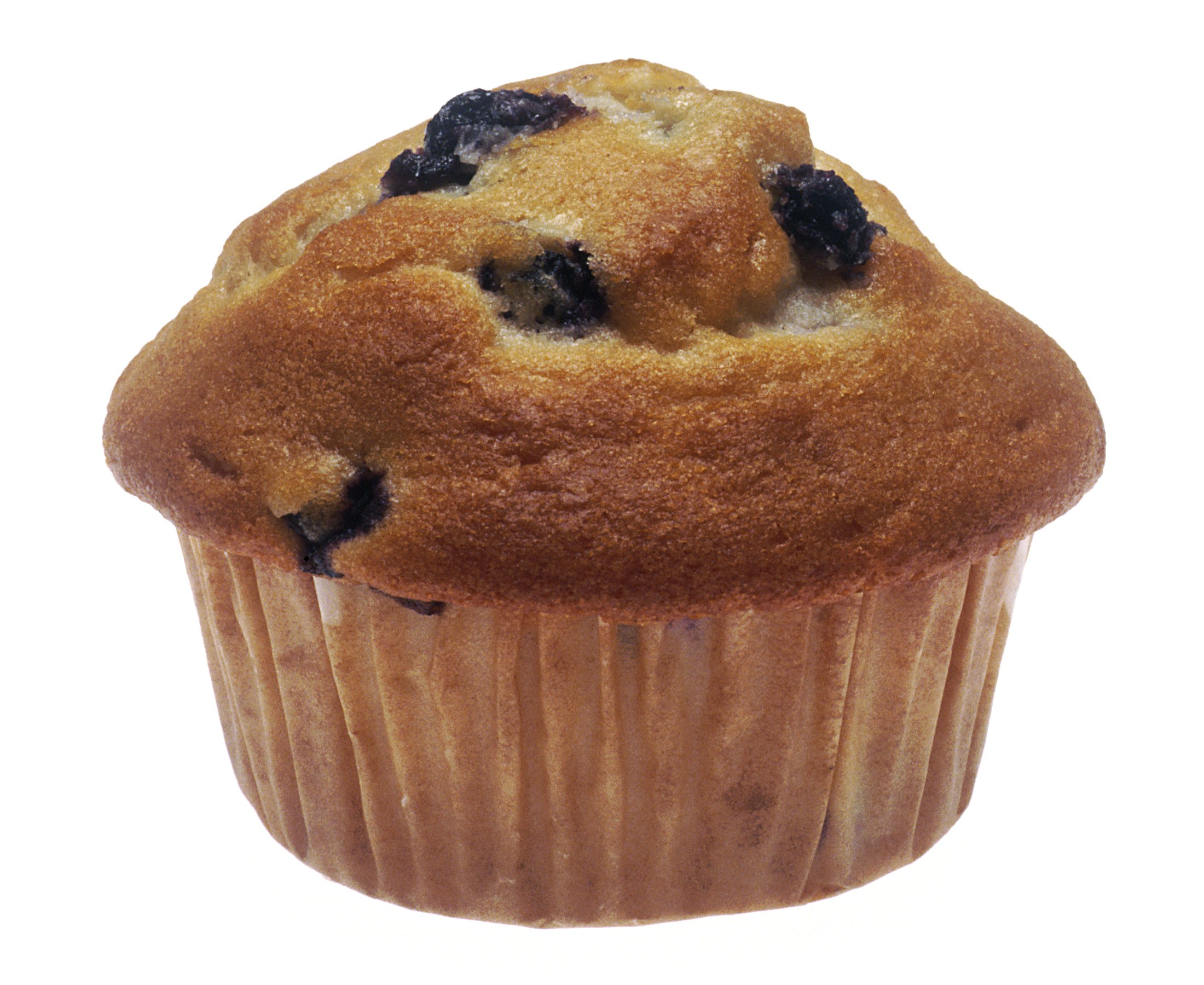
A muffin, with its top wider than its bottom

Muffin-top originated as Australian slang in mid-2003, but has since become popular in other English-speaking countries. Its use has also been adopted in many non-English-speaking countries across western Europe, such as Germany and France. It may have been first popularized by the Australian television show Kath & Kim. Australia's Macquarie Dictionary named "muffin-top" the word of the year in 2006; the American Dialect Society named it one of the "most creative" new terms that same year. The Oxford English Dictionary added the term to its revised online edition in March 2011.

According to William Safire, writing in The New York Times Magazine, "Muffin-top fills a lexical void" and "describes the roll of excess flesh spilling out primarily in front but possibly all around."

By 2007, the fashion for low-waist trousers and skirts had lost ground to higher-waisted garments, making muffin tops less ubiquitous.

== See also ==
- Visceral adipose tissue
- Camel toe
- Crop top – Top or t-shirt cut shorter than the waist
- Low-rise pants
- Lower-back tattoo
- Whale tail
