= Whale tail =

Rear portion of a thong or G-string

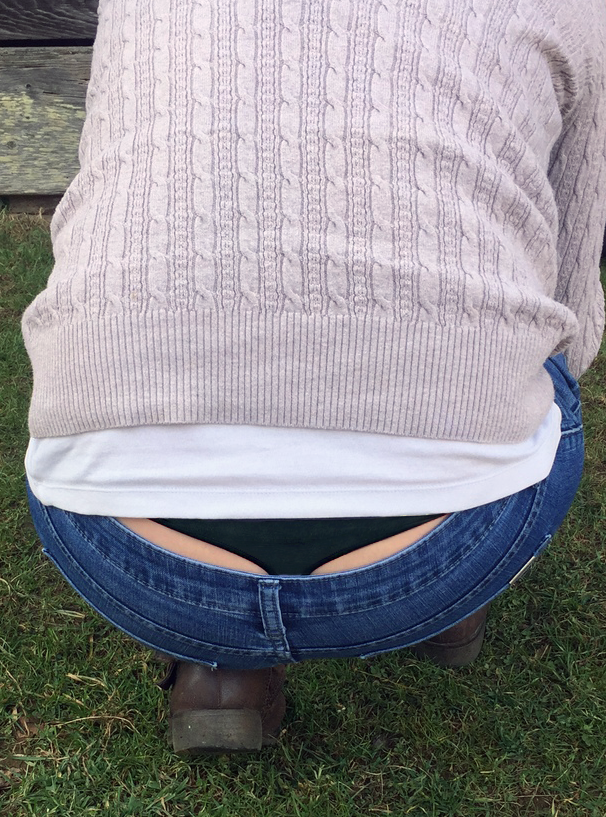
Whale tail above the rim of low rise jeans

Whale tail is the Y-shaped rear portion of a thong or G-string when visible above the waistline of low-rise trousers, shorts, or skirts that resembles a whale's tail. The fashion was popular in the early 2000s, but declined within the decade, and by 2019, had remerged in popularity.

Low-waisted trousers, such as low-rise jeans or hip-huggers, and higher-cut thongs led to greater exposure of the whale tail. The trend was also associated with the trend of sporting lower back tattoos.

The word was selected by the American Dialect Society in January 2006 as the "most creative word" of 2005.

== History ==
The rising popularity of low-rise jeans led to increased exposure of thong tops in the early 2000s. Originally shown by WWE female wrestler Lita in early 2000, others such as Britney Spears have been portrayed as a major contributor to the whale tail's popularity. Her whale tail display was mentioned in literature books such as Married to a Rock Star by Shemane Nugent, Thong on Fire by Noire, The Magical Breasts of Britney Spears by Ryan G. Van Cleave, and Off-Color by Janet McDonald. The Oregonian, a Portland, Oregon, newspaper, wrote in 2004, that an abundance of whale tails had become a distraction in schools. Social commentator Ann C. Hall identified this campus trend as an "apparent intersection between everyday campus fashion and soft porn". The layered clothing trend of the early 2000s was partly led by the whale tail style that incorporates hip-hugger jeans, crop tops and high riding thongs popularized by celebrities.

=== Rise ===
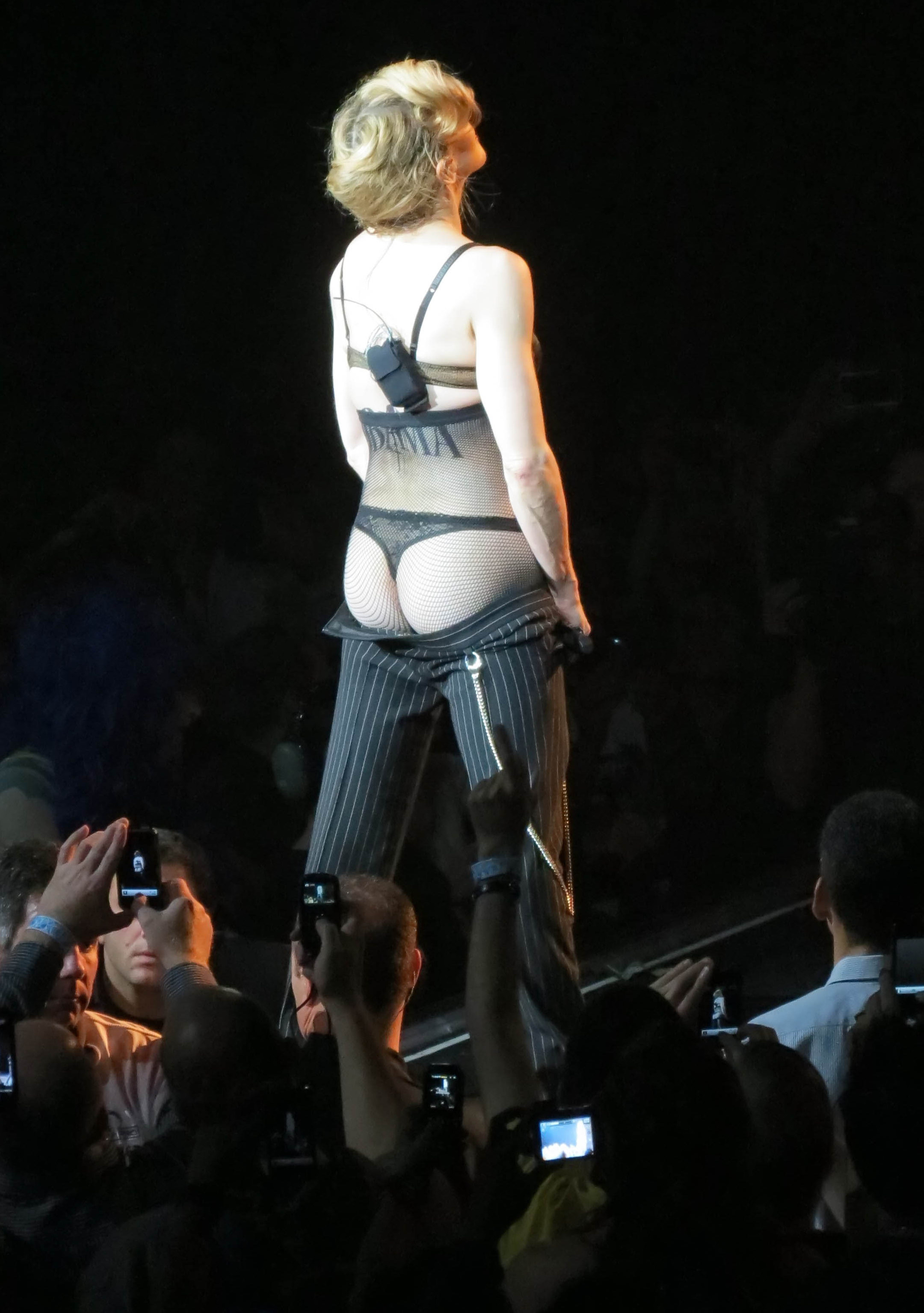
Recording artists such as Madonna (seen here undressing on stage at Seattle MDNA Tour in 2012), Christina Aguilera and Britney Spears made visible underwear and whale tails popular.

By the mid-2000s, whale tails became common to celebrities, providing opportunities to the paparazzi. Whale tail display spawned a new accessory, clip-on jewelry for the visible straps. Jess Cartner-Morley of The Guardian claimed that following celebrities in the hipster trousers gave rise to the "low-slung jeans, whale-tail G-string era". On 17 September 2004, a writer for the Chicago Sun-Times stated, "Britney Spears and Christina Aguilera regularly were photographed with thong straps riding high above their low-rise jeans. Halle Berry attended an awards show with bejeweled thong straps peeking out from above her miniskirt." Actresses Gillian Anderson, Natalie Portman, Sarah Jessica Parker, Kim Cattrall and Tara Reid, MTV's Molly Sims, model Kate Moss, singers Beyoncé, Mariah Carey, Jennifer Lopez, Janet Jackson, LeAnn Rimes and Britney Spears have been associated as propagators of the trend by ABC.

In France, clothing brands started creating the thong or le string in styles that encourage a projection above low-hung jeans, such as designs that had small jewels or luminous stars sewn into the "tail". In India, thongs were exposed from low-rise jeans in page three parties and university bashes. Indian model Shefali Jariwala displayed a whale tail in the music video "Kaanta Lagaa" and popularized to fame and public debate in 2003; the video won an MTV Immies award. In Japan, clothing company Sanna's created an extreme low-rise hip-hugging jeans design with built-in thong whale tails. R&B artist Sisqó mentioned whale tails in his "Thong Song"; "I like it when the beat goes da na da na/Baby make your booty go da na da na/Girl I know you wanna show da na da na/That thong th-thong thong thong." Another film titled Whale Tail: Thong Dreams was released in 2005 featuring Sunny Lane and Kirsten Price. In 2003, web content developer Gavin Hamilton created the site whale-tail.com with content featuring whale tail display. The domain name WhaleTail.com sold for $6,600 in October 2004. The website was covered by ABC Radio (Australia), The New York Times, FHM (UK) and Fuel Magazine (Australia), and was nominated for Best Adult Web Site by Australian Adult Industry Awards in 2008.

=== Legal debates ===
In 2004, Louisiana, State Representative Derrick Shepherd proposed a bill (HB1626), also known as the Baggy Pants Bill to Louisiana House of Representatives. The bill proposed that "it shall be unlawful for any person to appear in public wearing his pants below his waist and thereby exposing his skin or intimate clothing" and that violators would be subjected to three eight-hour days of community service and a fine of up to US$175. The measure died due to opposition from the American Civil Liberties Union. The bill was proposed again in 2008, and was rejected by a state Senate panel. In two Louisiana towns, Delcambre (a maximum penalty of US$615 fine or up to six months in prison) and Opelousas (a maximum penalty of US$500 fine or up to six months in prison), wearing low slung pants that reveal buttock cleavage or underpants is considered a misdemeanor. Clothing that reveal underpants were banned in four other Louisiana towns including Alexandria and Shreveport, where violators face fines of US$150 or 15 days in jail, as well as Hawkinsville, Georgia.

In February 2005, the Senate Courts of Justice Committee of Virginia voted unanimously in a hastily convened meeting against a bill proposed by Delegate Algie T. Howell Jr. of Norfolk, Virginia to impose a US$50 fine on any person who publicly and intentionally "wears and displays his below-waist undergarments, intended to cover a person's intimate parts, in a lewd or indecent manner" in a public place. The bill (HB1981), also known as the Droopy Drawers Bill, was earlier passed by Virginia House of Delegates by a 60–34 vote. Atlanta, Georgia, Dallas, Texas, Baltimore, Maryland, Charlotte, North Carolina, Yonkers, New York, Duncan, Oklahoma, Natchitoches, Louisiana, Stratford, Connecticut, Pine Bluff, Arkansas, Trenton, New Jersey, Pleasantville, New Jersey, as well as three other Georgia towns, Rome, Brunswick and Plains have attempted to ban underwear revealing over the pants. School dress codes sometimes also banned some low-rising pants or visible underwear.

=== Decline ===
The trend of wearing whale tail-revealing jeans started to dissipate in the mid-2000s when American clothing designers started shifting focus from low-slung jeans and exposed midriffs to high-waisted trousers and cardigans. Jess Cartner-Morley, fashion writer of The Guardian, claimed that the whale tail and the muffin top (the bulge of flesh hanging over the top of low-rider jeans), "twin crimes of modern fashion", had led to the decline in the popularity of hipster jeans. Louise Hunn, editor of the British edition of InStyle, stated, "When a look goes too mainstream, people start wearing it badly. And then the really fashionable people run a mile". While the thong still represented 24% of the US$2.5 billion annual market in women's underwear, it began to decline by end of 2004. Some vendors, including Victoria's Secret and DKNY, started selling thongs that do not result in whale tails. Adam Lippes, founder of the lingerie line ADAM, stated that women were "tired" of the trend and disliked seeing celebrities with it.

=== Resurgence ===
Starting in 2018 and 2019, the trend returned to prominence as fashion designers showcased the style at runways such as at the Met Gala. In 2019, publications including Vogue and the Daily Record began referring to a revived interest in the trend, with influencers such as Kim Kardashian, Hailey Baldwin and Dua Lipa prominently wearing it. The American singer-songwriter Beyoncé also adopted the look for a 2019 British Vogue photo shoot.

Copying celebrities, teenagers on TikTok, and members of Generation Z adopted the trend. By 2021, the trend had gained enough social media prominence that on the platform, with "#WhaleTail" having more than 32 million views by June 2021.

However, unlike the previous wave, when an almost accidental look was emphasized, the new wave instead placed an importance on purposefulness. While some influencers still wore a thong with a separate pair of clothing, the whale tail was the center of the fashion piece. For example, some companies sold skirts that had a thong built-in.

== Social cultural analysis ==
Attributing whale tails to mainstreaming of the sexualization of young women, The Santa Rosa, California Press Democrat termed the trend as "stripper chic". Post-modern activist Yasmin Jiwani and co-writers described the trend in Girlhood: Redefining the Limits as an attempt to redefine girlhood while acknowledging the debate around it. The book termed the trend as the "slut" look popularized by Britney Spears. Some experts even dubbed visible whale tails as "thong feminism" for young girls. Other experts accused marketers of "outrageous selling of sex to children".

One conjecture assumes that the style of exposed thong may have "bubbled-up" from the street level to the high streets, like the jeans and t-shirt look of James Dean. Another assumes the fad was initiated by glamour model Jordan in England and singers Mariah Carey and Spears in the United States. The phenomenon has been compared to the phenomenon of visible bra straps. Saying that "just as Madonna made bras a public garment in the 1980s, Ms. Lewinsky, Paris Hilton and Britney Spears transformed women's panties into a provocative garment intended for public display", The New York Times claimed that the thong, with straps worn high over the hips and exposed by fashionable low-rise jeans and "Juicy Couture" sweat pants, had become a public icon.

== Word of the year ==
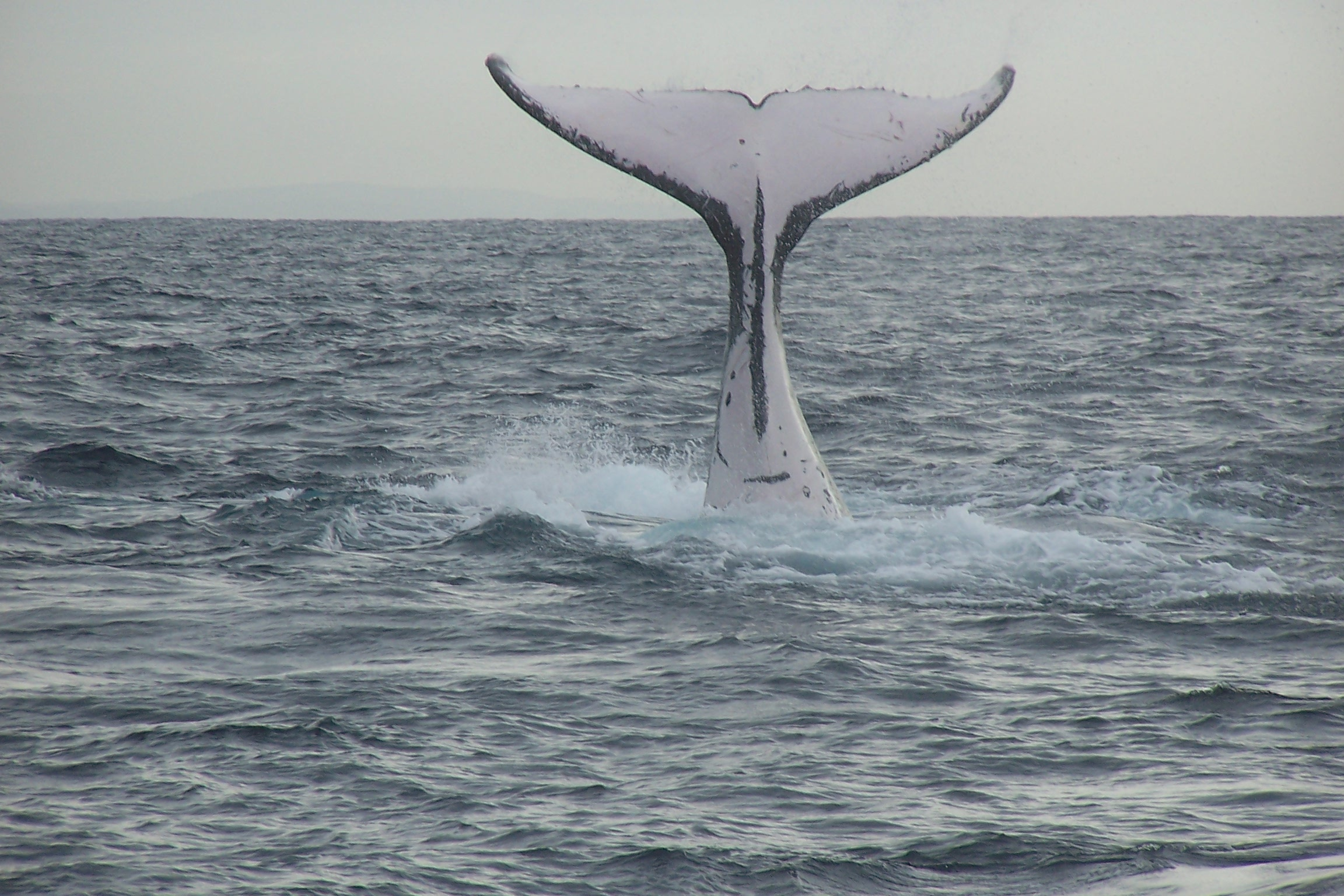
A whale's tail, also called a fluke, in whole or as one of the lobes.

"Whale tail" was selected in January 2006 as the "most creative word" of 2005 by the American Dialect Society, a group of linguists, editors, and academics. It received 44 votes to muffin top's 25, flee-ancée's (a reference to runaway bride Jennifer Wilbanks) 15, and pinosaur's (an old Wollemi pine tree near Australia's Blue Mountains) 6.

While discussing these new coinages, Sali Tagliamonte, associate professor of linguistics at the University of Toronto, observed that young women in North America had surpassed young men as influencers. The use of the word to indicate an underwear phenomenon was covered in mainstream news media, sometimes in reference to the pop stars who made the fashion trend popular. Wayne Glowka, member of the Georgia College and State University faculty and head of the New Word Committee of the Dialect Society, said about the word, "Language is just going on its merry way, creating many new words. It's time for men to win something."

== See also ==
- Buttock cleavage
- Camel toe
- Panty line
- Sagging
- Social impact of thong underwear
- Underwear as outerwear
- Upskirt
- Wardrobe malfunction
