= Exhibitionism =

Public exposure of intimate body parts

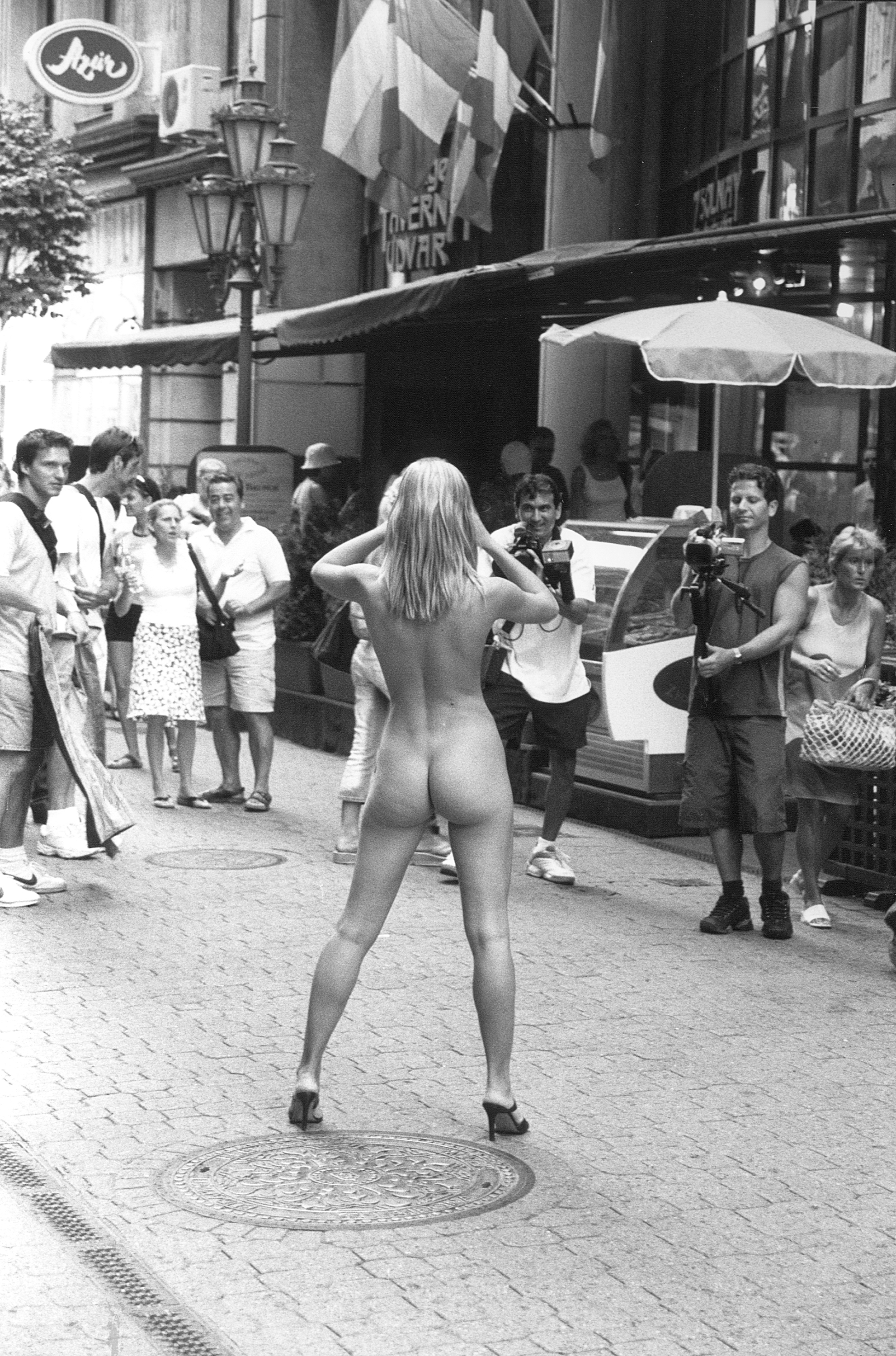
Naked exhibitionist woman on a Budapest street in 2007

Exhibitionism is the practice of exposing one's intimate parts – such as the breasts, genitals, or buttocks – in a public or semi-public environment. This can be done live or virtually as with nude selfies using technologies like smartphones to take nude pictures of oneself for show.

Such a display may be innocuous: to friends, acquaintances or strangers for their amusement or sexual satisfaction. It may also be to a bystander to shock them. In the latter case it classically involves men showing themselves to women and goes by legal terms such as indecent exposure or exposing one's person.

Psychologists and psychiatrists are solely concerned with this case and speak of an "exhibitionistic disorder" rather than just "exhibitionism". This is specifically an uncontrollable urge to exhibit one's genitals to an unsuspecting stranger. It is an obsessive-compulsive paraphilic pathology requiring psychiatric treatment.

== Psychological aspects ==
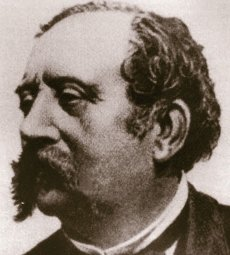
Charles Lasègue was the first to use the term exhibitionist, in 1877.

The term exhibitionist was first used in 1877 by French physician and psychiatrist Charles Lasègue. Various earlier medical-forensic texts discuss genital self-exhibition, however.

As observed in males, the largest demographic of exhibitionists, exhibitionism is associated with psychiatric comorbidity and impairment, including though not limited to, depression, psychopathy, psychosis, autism spectrum disorders, and substance abuse. Exhibitionism is also associated with higher rates of singleness, high pornography consumption, frequent masturbation, sexism, and narcissism.

When performed on a non-consenting person or a recurrent interference with quality of life or otherwise normal functioning, exhibitionism can be diagnosed as exhibitionistic disorder in the Diagnostic and Statistical Manual of Mental Disorders, fifth edition (DSM-5). The DSM reports the possible prevalence for exhibitionistic disorder in men as 2-4% maximum. It is thought to be less common in women.

In a Swedish survey, 2.1% of women and 4.1% of men admitted to becoming sexually aroused from the exposure of their genitals to a stranger.

A research team asked a sample of 185 exhibitionists, "How would you have preferred a person to react if you were to expose your privates to him or her?" The most common response was "Would want to have sexual intercourse" (35.1%), followed by "No reaction necessary at all" (19.5%), "To show their privates also" (15.1%), "Admiration" (14.1%), and "Any reaction" (11.9%). Only very few exhibitionists chose "Anger and disgust" (3.8%) or "Fear" (0.5%).

A study conducted in Hong Kong among people who self-identified as perpetrators of sexual assault found that exhibitionists and zoophiles are less likely to commit sexual assault by contact or rape than those who suffer from voyeurism, frotteurism, or scatophilia. According to another study, serial sex murderers have different profiles from those who have committed a single sexual homicide. Both groups often have personality disorders, but serial sex murderers are distinguished by a higher prevalence of narcissistic, schizoid, or obsessive-compulsive traits. They are also more likely to exhibit paraphilic behaviors such as masochism, sexual fetishism, pedophilia, exhibitionism, or voyeurism.

Exhibitionism, understood as self-promotion, is a fundamental driving force in human psychological life. When expressed constructively through sociability, creativity, volunteering, performance, or public responsibility, this dynamic promotes personal fulfillment and collective creativity. From this perspective, exhibitionism can be seen as a driving force, capable of connecting individuals and stimulating research. The forms this exhibition takes vary according to the individual and the circumstances, but could all unconsciously refer to a quest for recognition. Scenes of exhibitionism, whether they arise from dreams, fantasies, theater, aggression, or media culture, function as small dramatic devices in which issues of identity and sometimes deep suffering can be replayed.

=== Causes ===
Exhibitionism is compulsive behavior and, as such, is one of the possible symptoms of childhood sexual abuse. It can be linked to traumatic behaviors and traumatic sexualization. Neglect and trauma during childhood, particularly sexual trauma, are strongly linked to the development of paraphilias, of which exhibitionism may be one form. This traumatic conditioning can lead exhibitionist women or men to prostitution or sex shows.

== Victims ==
Most often, the victims of exhibitionists are women, frequently children, the majority of whom are young girls. According to an American study, 48.6% of women have experienced such an assault, 37% of them more than once in their lives. Approximately 28% of victims report an increased fear of sex crimes and changes in their social activities following the assault, while 68% of women surveyed consider exhibitionism to be dangerous. Another study indicates that 58.7% of women have been victims of an exhibitionist, reporting that their initial feelings were disgust and fear. 29% changed their habits to avoid being assaulted again, and only 7% reported the incident to the police, although this figure is trending toward more reports to the authorities. The study shows that, for victims, exhibitionist assault is similar to any other sexual assault. The cultural and institutional frameworks that legitimize or tolerate these sexist assaults and fail to protect child victims condemn some to becoming victims again and others to possibly becoming perpetrators.

== History ==
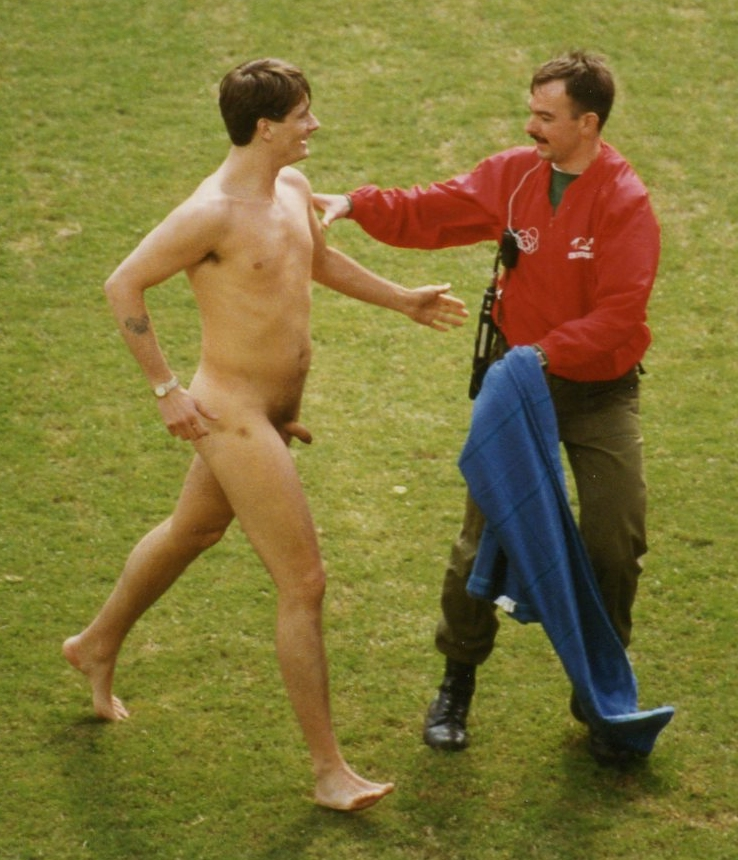
Mark Roberts, a well-known streaker, at the Hong Kong Sevens Rugby tournament in 1994

Public exhibitionism by women has been recorded since classical times, often in the context of women shaming groups of men into committing, or inciting them to commit, some public action. The ancient Greek historian Herodotus gives an account of exhibitionistic behaviors from the fifth century BC in The Histories. Herodotus writes that:

When people travel to Bubastis for the festival, this is what they do. Every baris carrying them there overflows with people, a huge crowd of them, men and women together. Some of the women have clappers, while some of the men have pipes which they play throughout the voyage. The rest of the men and women sing and clap their hands. When in the course of their journey they reach a community—not the city of their destination, but somewhere else—they steer the bareis close to the bank. Some of the women carry on doing what I have already described them as doing, but others shout out scornful remarks to the women in the town, or dance, or stand and pull up their clothes to expose themselves. Every riverside community receives this treatment.

A case of what appears to be exhibitionism in a clinical sense was recorded in a report by the Commission against Blasphemy in Venice in 1550. John Wilmot, 2nd Earl of Rochester was an early libertine in England, who was known for his exhibitionism.

In the United Kingdom, the 4th draft of the revised Vagrancy Act 1824 included an additional clause "or openly and indecently exposing their persons" which gave rise to difficulties because of its ill-defined scope. During the course of a subsequent debate on the topic in Parliament, the then-Home Secretary Robert Peel observed that "there was not a more flagrant offence than that of indecently exposing the person which had been carried to an immense extent in the parks ... wanton exposure was a very different thing from accidental exposure".

Researchers have linked the sending of unsolicited dick pics to exhibitionist and narcissistic biases and either ambivalent or aggressive sexism. A 2018 poll by YouGov found that in England 41% of young women had been sent an unsolicited dick pic.

The transition from a society of secrecy to a culture of mass disclosure, encouraged by digital technologies, constant media coverage, and the incentive to "show off" in order to exist publicly, is reshaping certain manifestations of exhibitionism. This general trend can amplify individual tendencies, sometimes to spectacular effect. Some authors, such as journalist Julien Picquart, draw an analogy between the constant sexualization of the media and that of individuals who expose themselves on digital social networks, referring to an exhibitionist society.

== Types of exposure ==
Various types of behavior are classified as exhibitionism, including:

- Anasyrma: the lifting of the skirt when not wearing underwear, to expose genitals.
- Candaulism: when a person exposes their partner in a sexually provocative manner.
- Flashing:
  - the momentary display of bare female breasts by a woman, with an up-and-down lifting of the shirt or bra
  - or, the exposure of a man's or woman's genitalia in a similar manner
- Martymachlia: a paraphilia which involves sexual attraction to having others watch the execution of a sexual act.
- Mooning: the display of bare buttocks by pulling down of trousers and underwear. The act is most often done for the sake of humour, disparagement, or mockery.
- Reflectoporn: the act of stripping and taking a photograph using an object with a reflective surface as a mirror, then posting the image on the Internet in a public forum. Examples include images of naked men and women reflected in kettles, TVs, toasters and even knives and forks. The instance generally credited with starting the trend involved a man selling a kettle on an Australian auction site featuring a photograph where his naked body is clearly visible; other instances followed, and the specific term "reflectoporn" was coined by Chris Stevens of Internet Magazine.
- Streaking: the act of running naked through a public place. The intent is not usually sexual but for shock value.
- Telephone scatologia: the act of making obscene phone calls to random or known recipients. Some researchers have claimed that this is a variant of exhibitionism, even though it has no in-person physical component.
- Underwear as outerwear: the intentional display of underwear as a fashion statement or to be provocative can also be seen as exhibitionism. When revealing thong underwear above pants or a skirt, the result is often called a whale tail.

The DSM-5 diagnosis for exhibitionistic disorder has three subtypes: exhibitionists interested in exposing themselves to non-consenting adults, to prepubescent children, or to both.

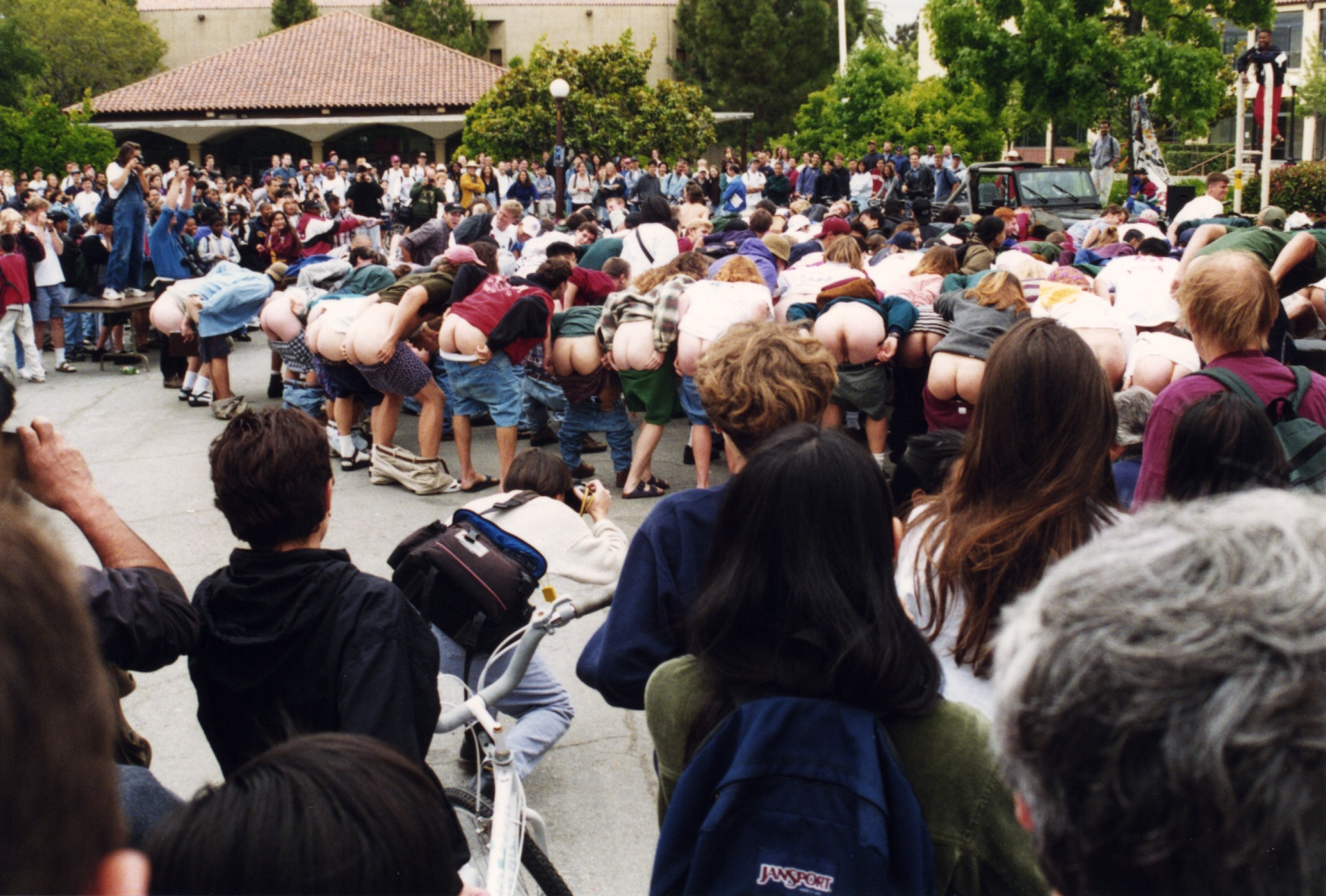
Students mooning at Stanford University in 1995, intended as an unspecified protest and a world record attempt

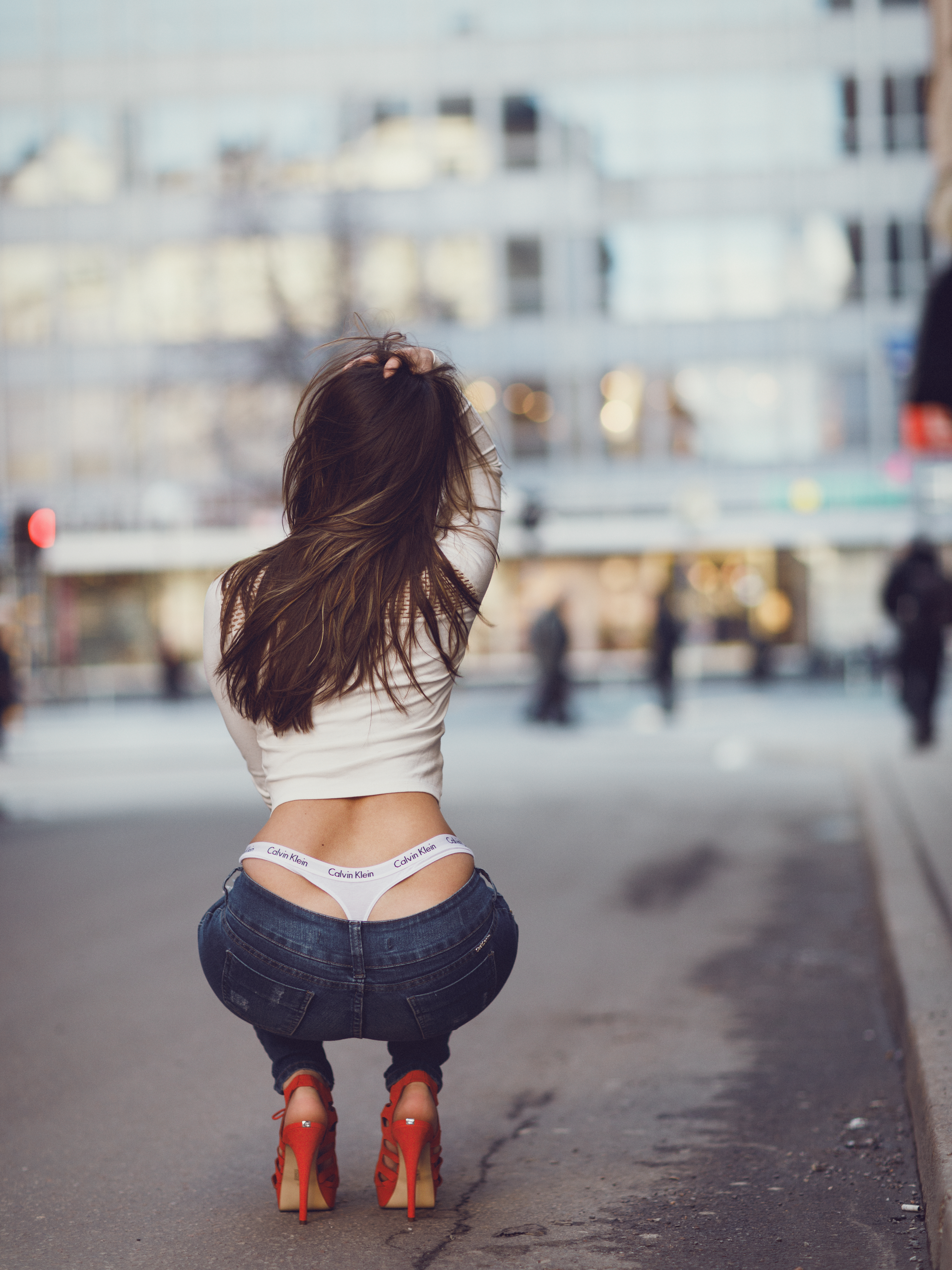
As a fashion statement, a woman in 2017 intentionally reveals her thong underwear to create a whale tail.

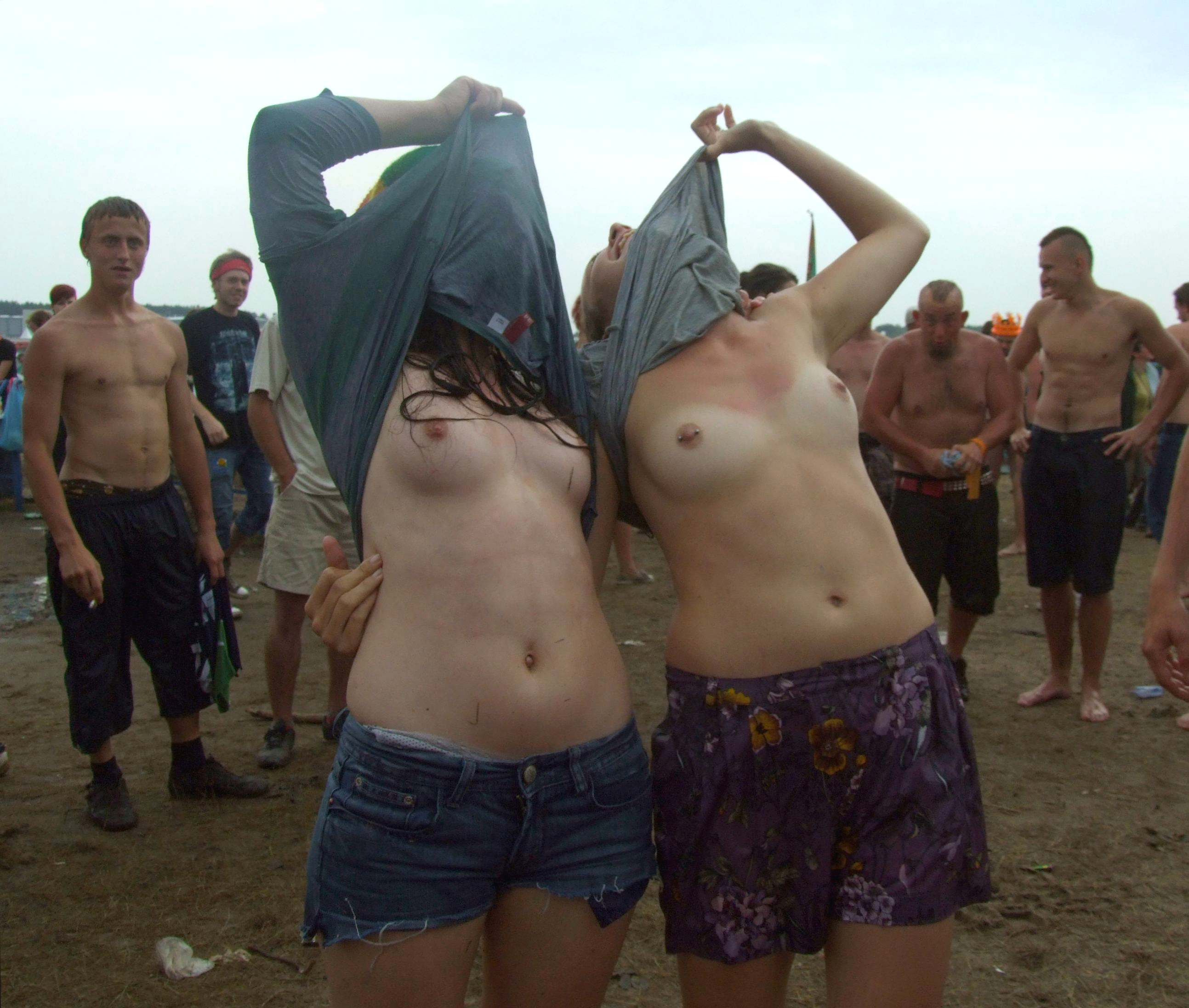
Women flashing at Woodstock Festival Poland, 2011

== See also ==
- Autagonistophilia
- Cyberflashing
- Dogging (sexual slang)
- Histrionic personality disorder
- Human sexual activity
- Human sexuality
- Naturism
- Naked News
- Nudity and sexuality
- Sex-positive feminism
- Spring break
- Sheela na gig
- Toplessness
- Upskirt
- Wardrobe malfunction
