= Midriff =

Human abdomen

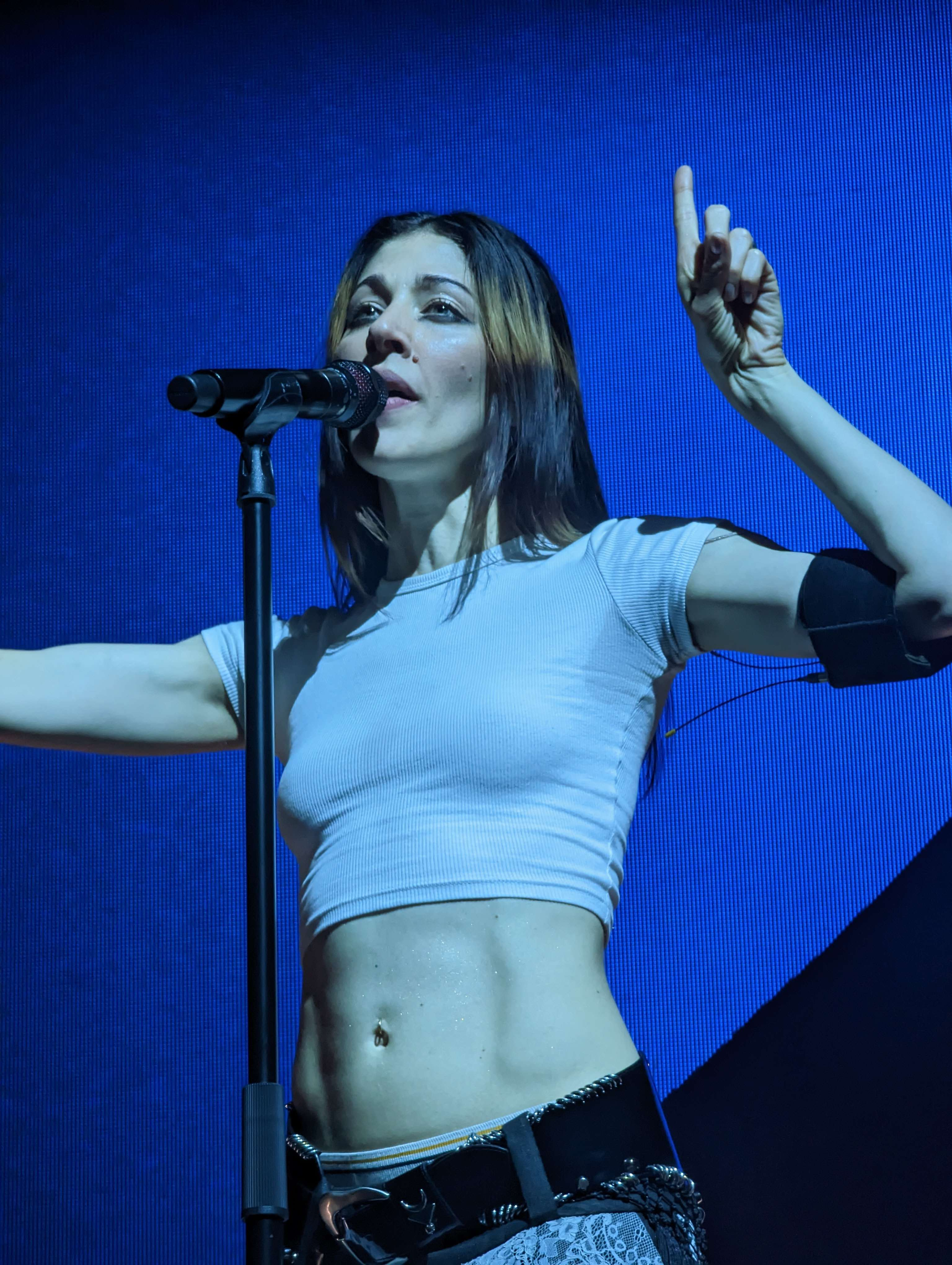
American singer-songwriter Caroline Polachek performing with her midriff exposed in 2023.

In fashion, the midriff is the human abdomen. The midriff is exposed when wearing a crop top or some forms of swimwear or underwear.

== Etymology ==
"Midriff" is a very old term in the English language, coming into use before 1000 AD.

In Old English it was written as "midhrif", with the old word "hrif" literally meaning stomach; in Middle English, it was "mydryf". The word fell into obsolescence after the 18th century.

The word was revived in 1941 by the fashion industry, partly to avoid use of the word "belly" which genteel women considered undesirable in reference to their bodies, as it has connotations of obesity.

== Culture and history ==
=== Western culture ===
==== 1930s–1970s ====
In some cultures, exposure of the midriff is socially discouraged or even banned, and Western culture has historically been hesitant in the use of midriff-baring styles. Bill Blass commented:

It is too difficult. Women will much more readily wear bare-back or plunging-neckline styles.

It was introduced to fashion in 1932 by Madeleine Vionnet when she offered an evening gown with strategically cut openings at the waist.

Women's swimwear of the 1930s and 1940s incorporated increasing degrees of midriff exposure.

Teen magazines of the late 1940s and 1950s featured similar designs of midriff-baring suits and tops. However, midriff fashion was stated as only for beaches and informal events and considered indecent to be worn in other public situations. Beginning in the late 1940s, school dress codes in the United States started to ban bare midriffs.

However, exposure of the female midriff and navel was widely brought into everyday Western women's fashion in the 1960s' sexual revolution and later with the popularity of halternecks, tube tops and crop tops in the 1970s.

The cheerleading style fashions developing largely from the styles originating with the Dallas Cowboys Cheerleaders in the early 1970s also played a crucial role in the popularity of midriff fashion at middle and high schools.

==== 1980s–1990s ====
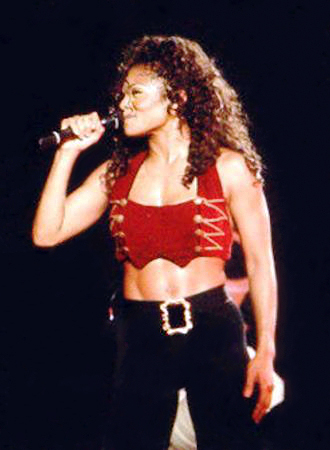
Janet Jackson baring her midriff in 1995

During the 1980s, pop star Madonna appeared in bare midriff looks in her performances and music videos, which helped in spreading this fashion widely.

The popularity of the bare midriff continued well due to low-rise fashion which started in the early 1990s when the British magazine The Face in its March 1993 issue cover featured Kate Moss in low-rise jeans. At the same time, the wide acceptance of navel display in Western societies, navel piercing and navel tattoos have become more common among young women. This raised the popularity of crop tops that expose the midriff and navel.

During the 1990s, many designers adapted to the trend. One way of showing the midriff that has proved popular with designers is simply fastening a jacket or vest at the neckline and letting it fall freely. When the wearer moves, there is a flash of skin, but nothing startling. Fashion designer Carolina Herrera said, "the midriff doesn't have to be completely bare; a veil of chiffon over the midriff can look intriguing."

==== 2000s–2010s ====
The bare midriff, with flat, toned abs, became the trend in Hollywood in the 2000s. Particularly present were the bare midriffs of Britney Spears, Jennifer Lopez, and Christina Aguilera.

=== Indian culture ===
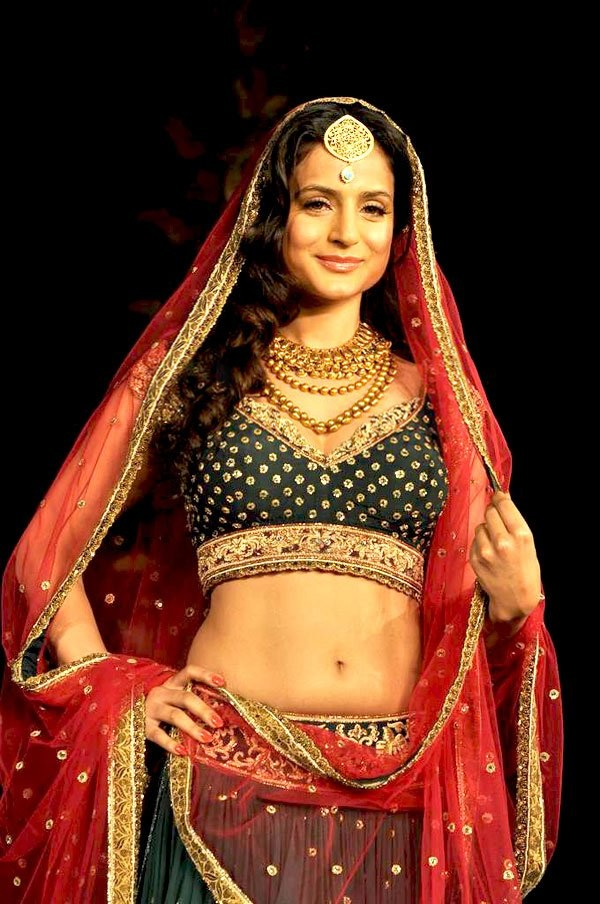
Indian actress Ameesha Patel posing in a ghagra choli that bares the midriff

Indian women have traditionally worn saris that partially cover the midriff, especially South Indian women.

The sari adapts to a woman's body, rather than defining it, allowing for pregnancy and otherwise expanding girth. In a culture where having enough to eat is not a given, rolls of fat around the midriff are a sign of prestige, rather than indulgence. Torsekar, a paediatrician from India who works in Toledo, Ohio, once said, "It may be hard for American women to imagine going to work with an exposed midriff, but for Indian women, the midriff is considered no more suggestive than the forearm."

Other Indian communities that take midriff in their stride include the women from Rajasthan, who leave the midriff exposed while wearing ghagra cholis. However, these women often cover their heads with a dupatta and even cover their faces in front of strangers, which enforces the belief that midriff-baring in India has a symbolic, almost mystical, association with birth and life and that the display is meant to emphasise the centrality of nature in the nurture role.

== See also ==
- Abdominal obesity
- Alvinolagnia
- Belly dance
- Crop top
- Navel in popular culture
- Waist
- Waist–hip ratio
- Waistline (clothing)
