= Coin slot =

Coin slot can refer to:

- A coin receptacle on vending machines, arcade machines and parking meters
- A slang term for buttock cleavage
