= Intimate part =

Human body part kept covered in public

An intimate part, personal part, or private part, is a place on the human body which is customarily kept covered by clothing in public venues and conventional settings, as a matter of fashion and cultural norms. Depending on the culture, revealing these parts can be a legal or religious offense.

== Definition ==
Definitions vary, but usually the body parts kept hidden are primarily the parts involved in sexual arousal, procreation, and elimination of excreta and related matter, including:

- for all sexes: the buttocks, anus, perineum, mons pubis, crotch, pubic hair, intergluteal cleft, buttock cleavage, and groin
- for males: the penis and scrotum
- for females: the vulva, breasts, and cleavage

The term intimate parts may be construed to mean only the external body parts that are visible when naked, rather than the body parts more commonly referred to. For example, when naked, the female pudendal cleft is predominantly visible rather than the vagina, and the male scrotum is visible rather than the testes which are contained within.

== Variations ==
Female breasts are considered as parts that would be covered in most contexts but with a degree of tolerance for toplessness varying in different regions and cultures. For example, Dayna Fischtein, Edward Herold and Serge Desmarais (2005) found that acceptance of toplessness in a sample of Canadians varied depending on both personal factors (such as the respondent's gender, age, and religion) and contextual factors (i.e., toplessness in streets, parks, or beaches).

In some periods of European history, female shoulders and legs may have been considered intimate parts. More conservative viewpoints in the West in some contexts still find it appropriate that females should cover their shoulders, particularly when entering a church or other sacred space.

In Islamic traditions, the definition of awrah is similar to the definition of intimate parts in Western culture. The extent of cover for the female body depends upon the situation, but may include the hair, shoulders, and neck in addition to the aforementioned "intimate parts". A majority of scholars agree that the entire body except the face and hands should be covered in public and in front of unrelated men. The exceptions are the scholars from the Hanafi school of thought, which has the largest number of followers, which agree that the feet are not part of the awrah and therefore may be revealed. For males, most scholars regard all parts of the body from the navel to the knees as awrah.

Intentionally touching the intimate parts of another person, even through clothing, is often associated with sexual intent. If this is done without the consent of the person being touched, it is considered groping, a form of sexual harassment or sexual assault.

== Alternate perspectives ==
Naturism is a lifestyle choice that is characterized by the practice of nudity, both alone and in groups. Some naturists hold that nakedness is not automatically a sexual state and that covering areas of the body is merely a social construct: they believe that the norms of society can be upheld even when all are nude.

== See also ==
- Erogenous zone
- Intimate parts in Islam
- Nudity § Public nudity
- Secondary sex characteristic
- Sex organ
- Taboo
