= David Eidelberg =

American neuroscientist

- Education: Columbia University, Harvard Medical School
- Occupations: Physician, Scientist
- Employer: Northwell Health
- Known for: Medical Research
- Website: http://www.feinsteinneuroscience.org

David Eidelberg is an American neuroscientist who is a professor of Neurology and Molecular Medicine at the Zucker School of Medicine. He is a neuroscientist best known for applying functional imaging of the brain to study neurological diseases.

== Education and career ==
Eidelberg earned his BA at Columbia University in 1977, and his MD from Harvard Medical School (HMS) in 1981. After completing residency training in neurology at the Harvard-Longwood Area Training Program, he pursued postdoctoral training as a Moseley Traveling Fellow at the National Hospital, Queen Square, in London, and at Memorial Sloan-Kettering Cancer Center in New York.

In 1988, Eidelberg joined North Shore University Hospital in Manhasset, New York, where he established the Functional Brain Imaging Laboratory and the Movement Disorders Center. He is Susan & Leonard Feinstein Professor of Neurology and Neuroscience at The Feinstein Institutes for Medical Research, and Professor of Neurology and Molecular Medicine at the Zucker School of Medicine. He is the Director of the Feinstein Center for Neurosciences and an attending neurologist at North Shore University Hospital in Manhasset.

== Research ==
Eidelberg has studied functional imaging methods to characterize large-scale network abnormalities in brain diseases like Parkinson's disease and dystonia.

== Awards and boards ==
- Elected Member: Association of American Physicians, 2019
- Bachman-Strauss Prize for Excellence in Dystonia, 2018
- Scientific Advisory Board Member: Michael J. Fox Foundation, 2004–2018
- Associate Editor: Journal of Neuroscience, 2011–2017
- Editor-in-Chief (Western Hemisphere): Current Opinion in Neurology, 2017
- Scientific Advisory Board Member: Bachmann-Strauss Dystonia and Parkinson Foundation, 2009–2014
- Scientific Director of The Thomas Hartman Foundation for Parkinson's Research, 2007–2012
- American Academy of Neurology Movement Disorders Research Award, 2010
- American Parkinson Disease Association Fred Springer Award, 2005
- Editorial Board Member: Journal of Nuclear Medicine (1999–2018), Current Opinion in Neurology (2001–present), and Annals of Neurology (2006–2019)
