= Lower-back tattoo =

Tattoo style that became popular in the late 1990s

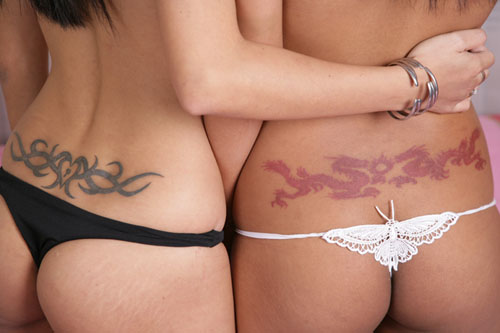
Two women with lower-back tattoos wearing thongs

A lower-back tattoo, also known as tramp stamp, is a tattoo on the lower back that became popular in the last decade of the 20th century, and gained a reputation for their erotic appeal. The tattoos were sometimes accentuated by low-rise jeans or crop tops. Their popularity was in part due to the influence of female celebrities. A 2011 study of media stereotypes criticized media portrayals of lower-back tattoos, arguing that they were unfairly cast as a symbol of promiscuity.

== History ==
Although historically in the western world men are more often tattooed than women, in the early 1990s the practice gained popularity among women. Prior to the late 20th century, women with tattoos were heavily stigmatized, and were rarely found in middle-class society. Lower-back tattoos were popularized in the early 2000s, in part owing to the influence of female celebrities, including Britney Spears, Aaliyah, Christina Ricci and Pamela Anderson. The popularity of low-rise jeans and crop tops may have also spurred the increase in lower-back tattoos. Another appeal of tattooing the lower back is that there is little fat there, lessening the chance that images will become misshapen over time. Also, the lower back is often concealed, providing women the choice of when to reveal their tattoo. Although some males have lower-back tattoos, including some celebrities, they are generally not acquired by men.

== Perception ==
Women's lower backs are often viewed by people as an erotic body part, leading to the association of lower-back tattoos with sexuality. Lower-back tattoos are also perceived as an indication of promiscuity by some, possibly owing to media portrayals of women with tattoos. A 2011 study of media stereotypes criticized media portrayals of lower-back tattoos, arguing that they are unfairly cast as a symbol of promiscuity. The show Saturday Night Live seems to at least have partially played a role in bringing prejudice and shaming to the placement of the tattoo. For instance, the term "tramp stamp" started gaining widespread popularity after being used in one of their May 2004 skits. In another instance, the show also satirized the practice, describing a "rub-on" tattoo remover marketed at middle-age women who received lower-back tattoos while young. Sports Illustrated once edited out Danica Patrick's tattoo out of the magazine for her issue. SI stated Patrick was aware of the edit and responded "The Swimsuit Issue emphasizes natural beauty". Actress Jessica Alba regretted her lower back bow tattoo and had it removed.

== Medical aspects ==
Medical practitioners who administer anesthesia have questioned whether epidural analgesia should be provided to people with lower-back tattoos. Concerns have emerged that epidural catheters may cause tattoo pigment to enter interspinous ligaments and other areas, potentially leading to health problems. There is consensus that epidural catheters should not be placed through irritated or infected tattoos. However, harm has not been clearly documented when placing epidural catheters through healthy tattooed skin; a review in the American Association of Nurse Anesthetists Journal concluded that "epidural catheter placement through lumbar tattoos is a practitioner's decision based on clinical judgment". In Current Opinion in Anesthesiology, Frédéric J. Mercier and Marie-Pierre Bonnet state that the evidence for complications when placing epidural catheters is unconvincing, but advocate avoiding the practice owing to the lack of long-term evidence.

== See also ==
- Dimples of Venus – Depressions over the gluteal fold
