= Buttock cleavage =

Minor exposure of the buttocks

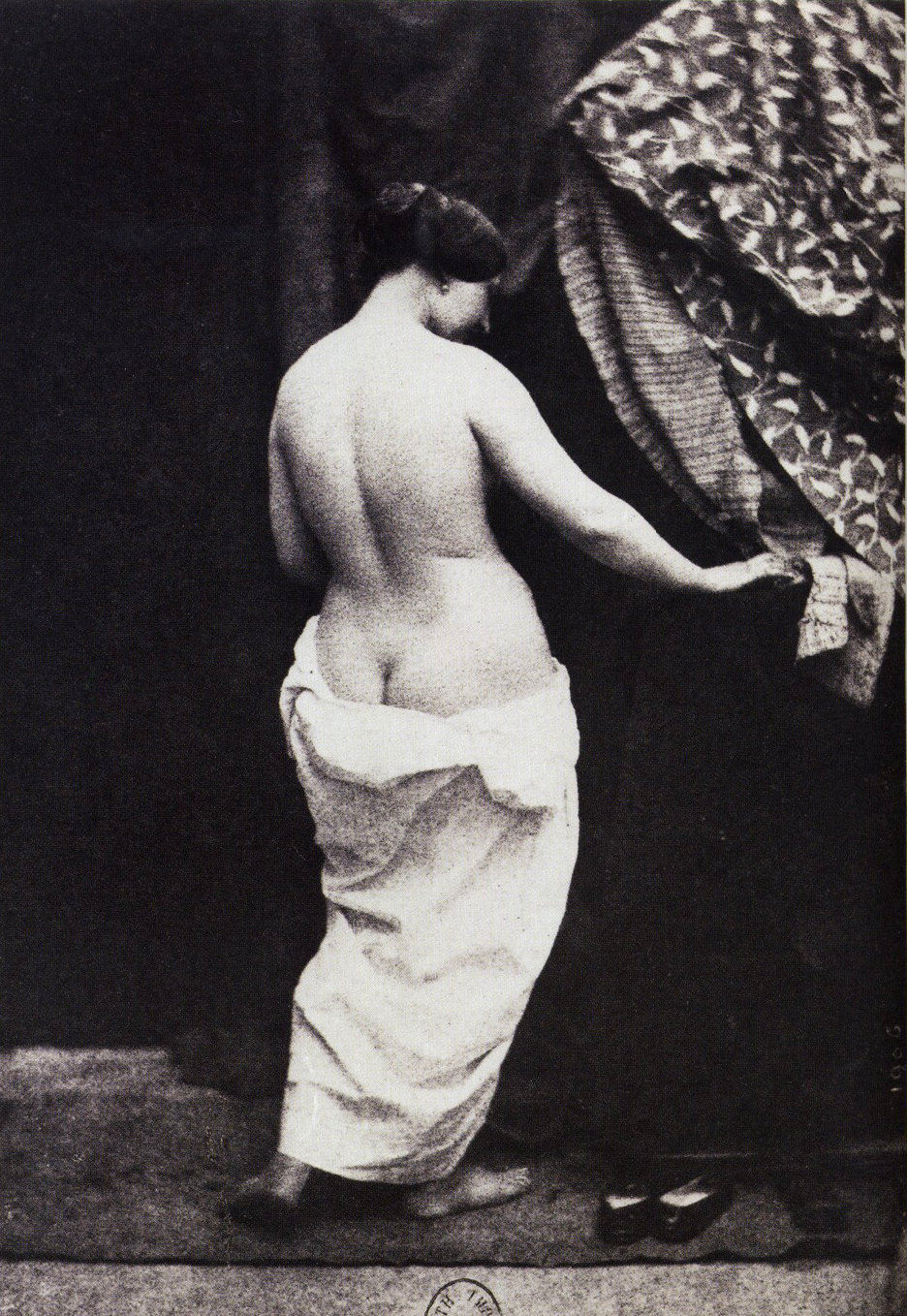
Photograph by Julien Vallou de Villeneuve (1854)

Buttock cleavage is minor exposure of the buttocks and the intergluteal cleft between them, often because of low-rise trousers.

== History ==
When faced with indecency issues in the 1930s, W. G. Cassidy explained in an 1974 essay titled "Private Parts: A judicial view" that exposure of a buttock cleavage may come under "other private parts" in Australian law, though indecency generally involves exposure of the genitals.

In the early 2000s, it became fashionable for young women and men to expose buttock cleavage, often while wearing low-rise jeans. The Cincinnati Enquirer called it the "new cleavage", and expressed views that "It's virtually impossible to find jeans to cover your hipbone". In August 2001, The Sun had a week dedicated to buttock cleavage called "bum cleavage week".

In 2005, author Sheila Jeffreys identified British designer Alexander McQueen as the originator of buttock cleavage-revealing jeans, known as the "bumster".

In 2013, Cosmopolitan noted that ultra-short miniskirts and shorts exposing the lower buttocks had gained popularity among women, influenced by celebrities such as Lady Gaga.

In the 2020s, buttcrack cleaveage gained a massive resurgence in popularity among society especially towards Gen Z women.

== Terms used ==
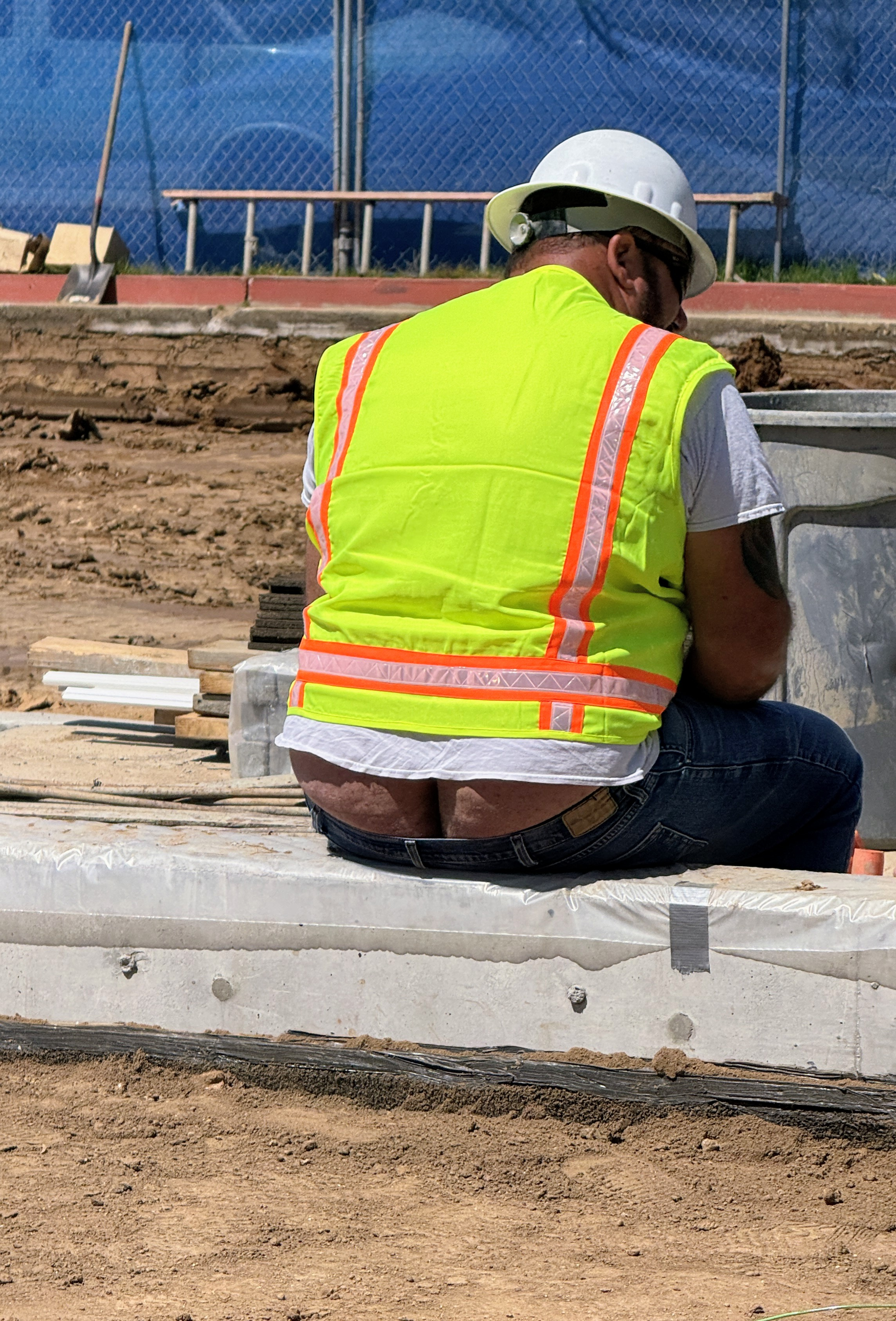
Construction worker displaying plumber's crack

The terms plumber butt or plumber's crack (Canadian, Australian, and American English) and builder's bum (English) refer to the exposure of the buttock cleavage. The expression "builder's bum" was first recorded in 1988. The terms are based on an impression that work in these professions frequently involves bending over in locations where bystanders are observing from the rear.

The terms used in foreign countries, such as bouwvakkersdecolleté in the Netherlands, Maurerdekolleté in Germany, and dekolt hydraulika in Poland, are translated as "builder's/mason's/plumber's cleavage". In France, it is usually referred to as le sourire du plombier, which is translated to "the plumber's smile".

== See also ==
- Breast cleavage
- Camel toe
- Sagging
- Wardrobe malfunction
- Whale tail
