= Current Opinion (Lippincott Williams & Wilkins) =

Series of medical journals

Current Opinion is a series of medical journals published by Wolters Kluwer imprint Lippincott Williams & Wilkins. Wolters Kluwer acquired the journals from the Thomson Organisation in 1997. Each of these journals publishes editorials and reviews within one of a number of medical disciplines.

== Journals ==
The following journals are part of this series:

- Current Opinion in Allergy and Clinical Immunology
- Current Opinion in Anesthesiology
- Current Opinion in Cardiology
- Current Opinion in Clinical Nutrition and Metabolic Care
- Current Opinion in Critical Care
- Current Opinion in Endocrinology, Diabetes and Obesity
- Current Opinion in Gastroenterology
- Current Opinion in Hematology
- Current Opinion in HIV and AIDS
- Current Opinion in Infectious Diseases
- Current Opinion in Internal Medicine
- Current Opinion in Lipidology
- Current Opinion in Nephrology and Hypertension
- Current Opinion in Neurology
- Current Opinion in Obstetrics and Gynecology
- Current Opinion in Oncology
- Current Opinion in Ophthalmology
- Current Opinion in Organ Transplantation
- Current Opinion in Orthopaedics
- Current Opinion in Otolaryngology & Head and Neck Surgery
- Current Opinion in Pediatrics
- Current Opinion in Psychiatry
- Current Opinion in Pulmonary Medicine
- Current Opinion in Rheumatology
- Current Opinion in Supportive and Palliative Care
- Current Opinion in Urology
