= Intergluteal cleft =

Groove between buttocks

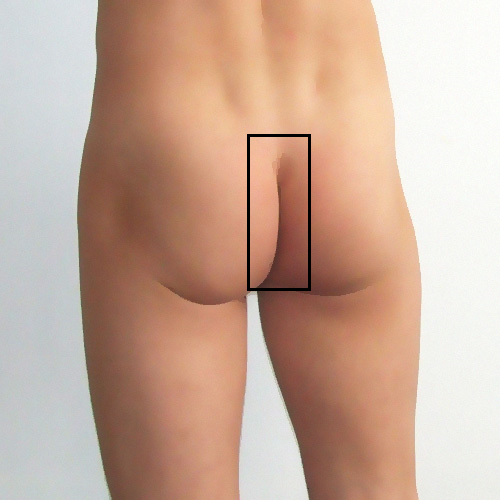
- Male

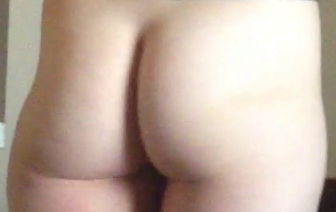
- Female

Details

Identifiers
- Latin: crena analis or crena interglutealis
- TA98: A01.2.08.003
- TA2: 314
- FMA: 20234

The intergluteal cleft (Note: Other formal names include the gluteal cleft, natal cleft, cluneal cleft, anal cleft, crena analis, crena interglutealis, and rima ani.) is the groove between the buttocks that runs from just below the sacrum to the perineum, containing the anus. Colloquially, the intergluteal cleft is known as bum crack (UK) or butt crack (US). The name "intergluteal cleft" is used because it forms the visible border between the external rounded protrusions of the gluteus maximus muscles.

There are several disorders that can affect the intergluteal cleft including inverse psoriasis, caudal regression syndrome, and pilonidal disease.

== See also ==
- Anal canal
- Anatomical terms of location
- Buttock cleavage
- Rectum
- Thong – Garment worn as underwear or as part of a swimsuit
- Whale tail – Part of a thong or G-string
