= Low-rise (fashion) =

Clothing which sits low on or below the hips

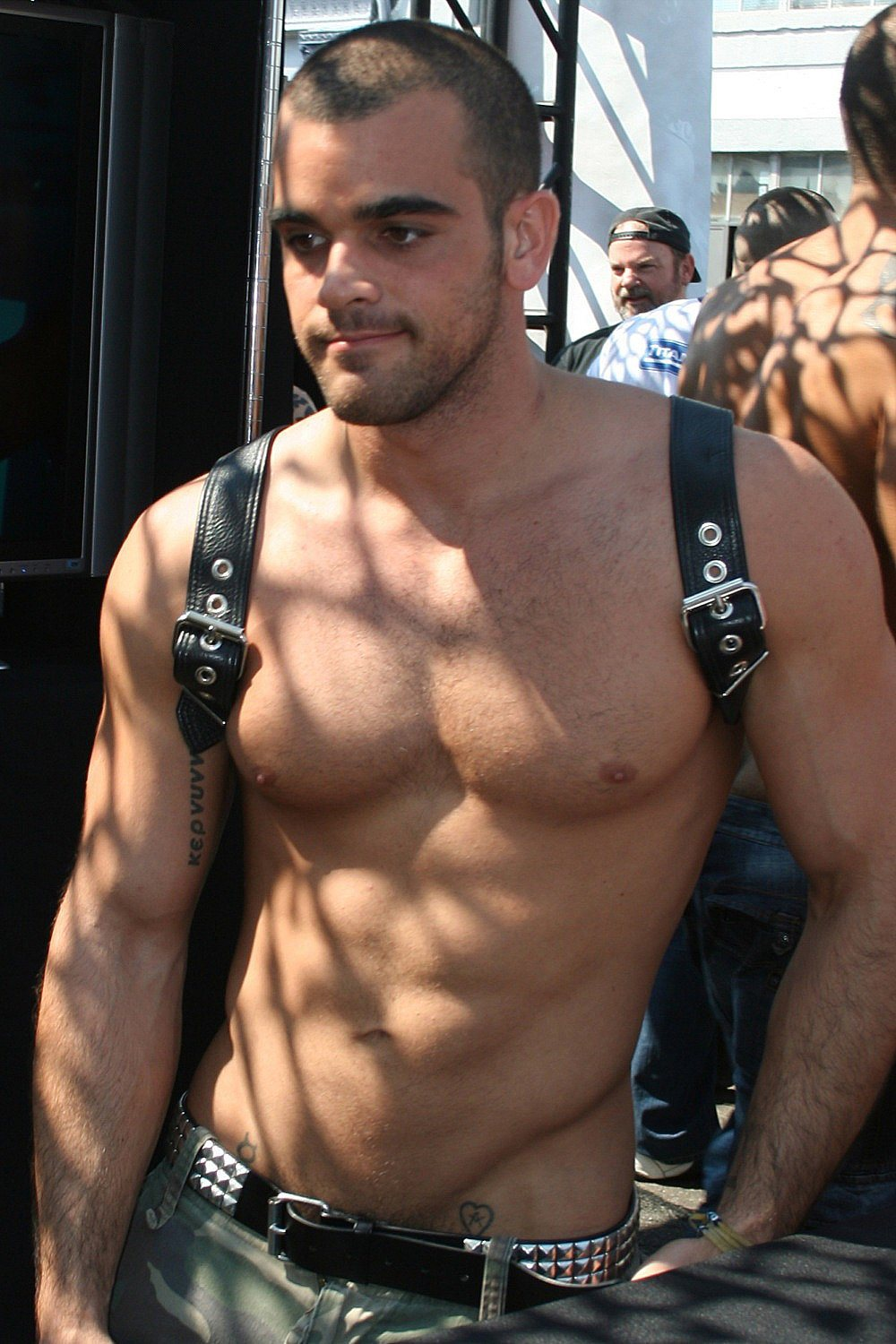
Porn star Damien Crosse in low-rise clothing at Folsom Street Fair 2010

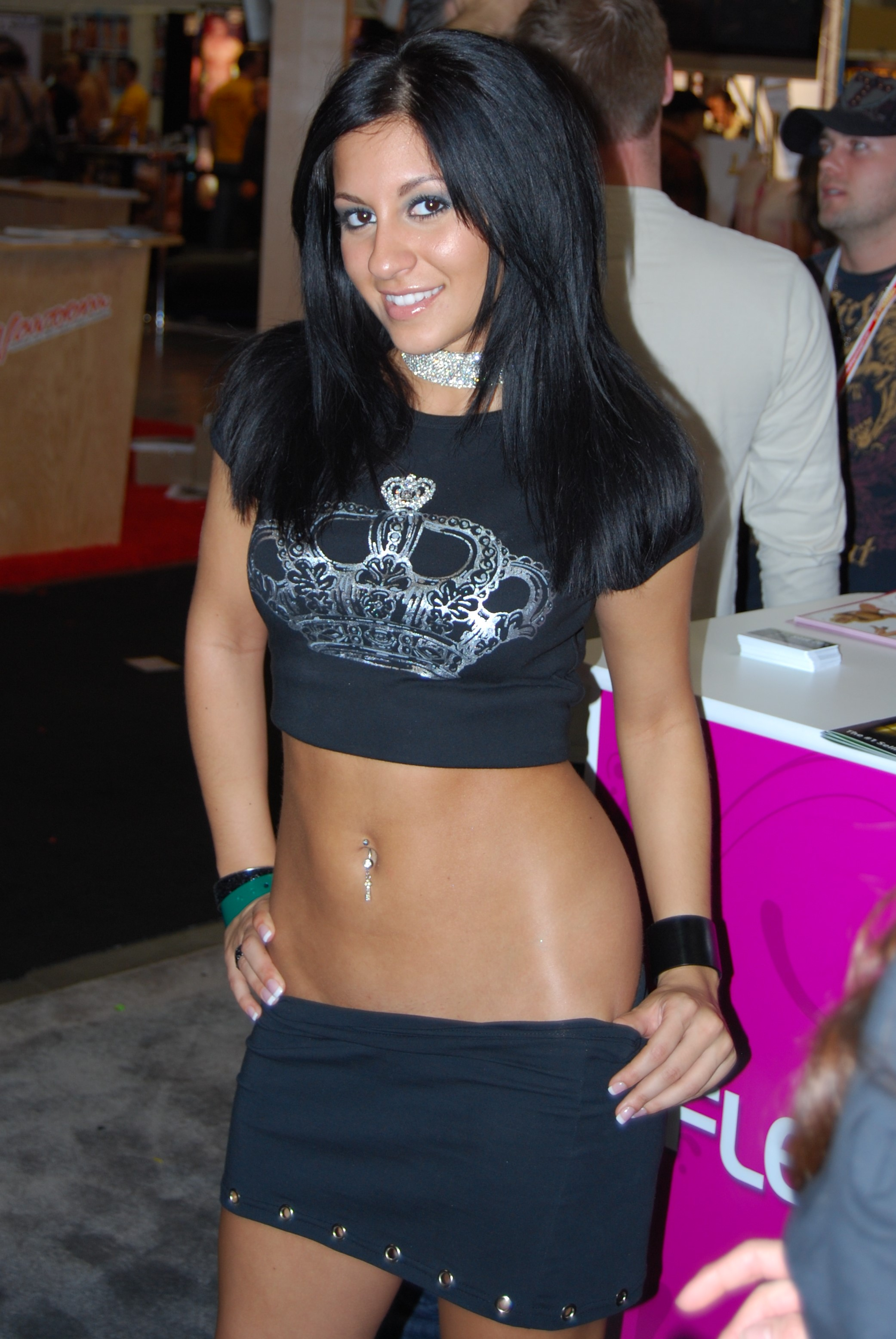
Porn star Raven Riley in low-rise clothing at AVN Adult Entertainment Expo 2008

Low-rise is a style of clothing designed to sit low on, or below, the hips. The style has also been called lowcut, hipster, bumster, or hip-hugger, and can apply to garments worn by all genders. The term can be applied to all garments that cover the wearer's crotch area, including trousers, jeans, shorts, skirts, panties, briefs, bikinis, pantyhose, and tights.

== Terminology ==
The "rise" of a bottom garment is measured by the distance between the crotch and the waistline or top of the garment and is usually around 12 inches (30 cm) on regular pants. The average rise of a low-rise garment is roughly 8 inches (20 cm) with some as little as 3 to 4 inches (7.6 to 10.2 cm). A normal low-rise sits at least 2 to 3 inches (5 to 8 cm) below the navel. A "super" or an "ultra low-rise" sits at 4 to 5 inches (10 to 13 cm) below the navel.

Low-rise jeans may be worn with crop tops to expose skin at the waist, torso, and hips, sometimes showing the midriff and navel, especially in warm climates.

== History ==
The 1990s revival of low-rise jeans can be credited to British fashion designer Alexander McQueen, who first showed low-rise "bumster" trousers in his 1993 Taxi Driver collection. One commentator observed: "The bumster for me is what defined McQueen. For me it was the look that put him on the map because it was controversial. Those little bumsters were in his first shows. It was like 20 people in England were wearing them back then." The low-rise fashion expanded in the early 1990s after the March 1993 issue of the British magazine The Face which featured Kate Moss in low-rise jeans.

Clothing manufacturer Levi Strauss & Co. introduced low-rise jeans in December 2000, the tops of which were about three inches (7 1/2 cm) below the navel, with a zipper of a mere 3 1/4 inches (8.3 cm) long. Backs were also cut low, but not so low that they exposed backside cleavage. It later adopted the style in men's wear. Gradually the wide acceptance of low-rise pants by men led to low-rise swimwear and underpants.

Britney Spears is credited with popularizing the fashion in the US in the early 2000s. From 2001 to 2007, low-rise jeans often exposed thongs or G-strings, but this declined after 2007. Sitting or bending could reveal buttock cleavage, while thongs visible above the waistband were called "whale tails" due to their shape. Exposed, sagging boxer shorts also became common. As underwear became more visible, men and women increasingly chose styles to complement low-rise jeans.

The trend became so popular that in 2002, a Barbie doll wearing low-rise jeans named "My Scene" Barbie was introduced in stores. The doll was created in an attempt to appeal to older girls in the tween demographic who may find the My Scene Barbie's fashion style to be more realistic and modern.

The trend was also in style during the 2020s. Kathryn Newton wore a two-piece midriff baring schoolgirl-style outfit with a low-rise skirt exposing her belly button at San Diego Comic-Con in 2022.

== Indian fashion ==
The term is applied to saris and Ghagra cholis especially in India and Indian diaspora communities. Many Indian women began to wear the normal sari below the waistline exposing the navel, which is known as low-rise sari. This type of sari is worn such that the petticoat is tied at some inches below the navel and just above the pubic area. Similarly, the lehengas of ghagra cholis are also worn in low-rise. Designer Manish Malhotra's Fashion Week collections regularly highlight low waisted ghaghras accompanied by short cholis. This were made popular by women celebrities of Bollywood industry and other popular regional film industries like Tamil cinema and Telugu cinema. These are mainly worn by the rich, educated upper-class women who consider navel exposure as a fashion. However, sometimes, the navel is covered with the pallu in a low-rise non-transparent sari, as well.

== Dress codes ==
In 2004 Vitruvio Pollione Scientific High School, Avezzano, central Italy, asked students to stop wearing low-slung trousers that expose navels, underwear etc., Deputy Principal Nazzareno Desiderio elaborated in a phone interview: "It's a piece of advice, for their educational reflection." Inspired by the decision in Avezzano, the principal of Rome's Visconti High School Antonino Grasso had suggested that students show less skin and proposed a debate on the matter. In an interview he commented, "Today, boys are less tickled by such visions (of skin), because there's no more big effect in seeing a girl's legs or shoulders, lower back and navel".

In some corporations in India, saris are required to be worn in an elegant manner, avoiding navel exposure. Anita Gupta, senior vice-president at JWT Chennai commented, "Formal wear for women definitely covers saris without plunging necklines or glimpses of the belly button".

Low-rise clothing is completely forbidden in certain countries around the world, including Iran, Libya, Algeria, Afghanistan, and Yemen.

== See also ==
- Cultural views on the midriff and navel
- Crop top
- Muffin top
- Navel in popular culture
