= Wardrobe malfunction =

Accidental exposure of nudity in public

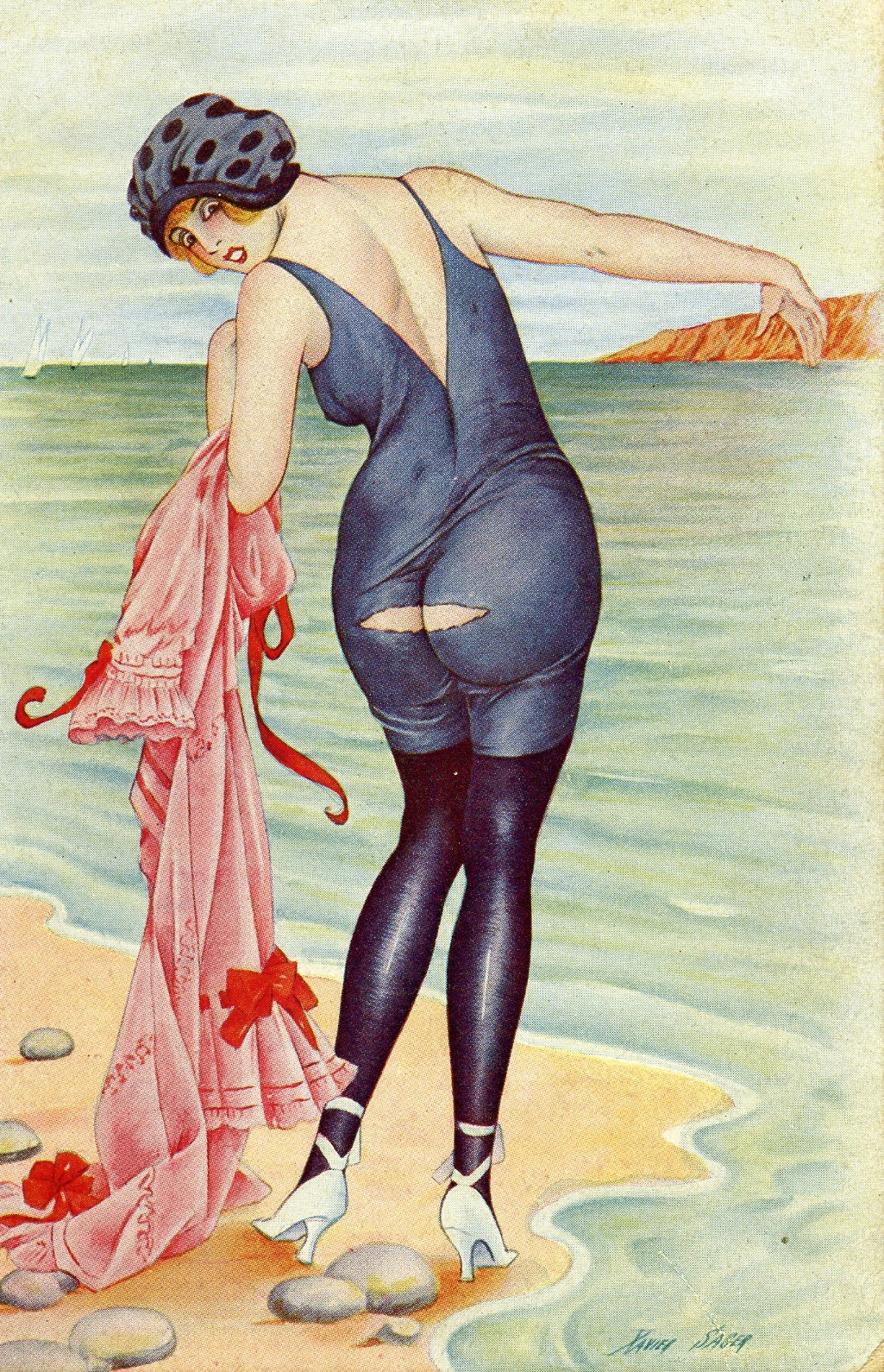
An artist depicts torn clothing that uncovers a woman's buttocks

A wardrobe malfunction is a clothing failure that accidentally exposes a person's intimate parts. It is different from deliberate incidents of indecent exposure or public flashing. Justin Timberlake first used the term when apologizing for the Super Bowl XXXVIII halftime show controversy during the 2004 Grammy Awards, saying that he accidentally revealed Janet Jackson's breast instead of just her brassiere. The phrase wardrobe malfunction was in turn used by the media to refer to the incident and entered pop culture. There was a long history of such incidents before the now-common term was coined.

The American Dialect Society defines "wardrobe malfunction" as "an unanticipated exposure of bodily parts".

== Etymology ==
The term was first used on February 2, 2004, by Justin Timberlake and Janet Jackson in a statement attempting to explain the Super Bowl XXXVIII halftime show controversy, during which Jackson's right breast was exposed. Timberlake apologized for the incident, stating he was "sorry that anyone was offended by the wardrobe malfunction during the halftime performance of the Super Bowl..." The term wardrobe malfunction appeared in numerous stories in major US consumer and business publications, newspapers, and major TV and radio broadcasts. Journalist Eric Alterman described the incident as "the most famous 'wardrobe malfunction' since Lady Godiva." It was also one of the new entrants into the Chambers Dictionary in 2008, along with electrosmog, carbon footprint, credit crunch and social networking. That dictionary defines it as "the temporary failure of an item of clothing to do its job in covering a part of the body that it would be advisable to keep covered."

=== Related terms ===
The American Dialect Society's word of the year nominations in 2004 included a number of terms related to this one, including Janet moment ("unplanned bodily exposure at a public function"), boobgate ("scandal over Janet Jackson's exposed breast"), nipplegate (like boobgate, "but used earlier in squawk over Jackson's possible nipple ring"), and wardrobe malfunction ("overexposure in a mammary way").

== Female ==
After Brigitte Bardot gained international fame in 1953 as the Bikini girl of the French Riviera, paparazzi popularized revealing accidents or staged events with women's swimwear throughout the decade. For one of many instances, a cheesecake photo of rising starlet Daliah Lavi adjusting her bikini after it broke while at a Rio de Janeiro swimming pool was widely circulated by Associated Press in 1959.

On February 1, 2004, the halftime show of Super Bowl XXXVIII was broadcast live from Houston, Texas, on the CBS television network in the United States. During the show, Justin Timberlake mistakenly removed a portion of Janet Jackson's costume, exposing for about half a second her breast adorned with a nipple shield. This was the first recorded usage of the term "wardrobe malfunction". The incident, sometimes referred to as Nipplegate, was news worldwide. MTV's chief executive said that Jackson had planned the stunt and Timberlake was informed of it just moments before he took the stage. The stunt was broadcast live to a total audience of 143.6 million viewers.

== Male ==
Wardrobe malfunctions have also affected male celebrities. While playing Five Nights at Freddy's: Security Breach during a livestream, American streamer and cultural ambassador IShowSpeed accidentally exposed his penis. Although the livestream was aired on YouTube where nudity is prohibited, he avoided a ban due to the fact it was accidental. The incident later became known as "IShowMeat".

On occasion, the media may treat wardrobe malfunction as more sensational when a family member witnesses the incident or the press frenzy aftermath, as mentioned for instance for Zoë Kravitz, in relation to her father Lenny Kravitz when his ripped trousers on stage in Sweden in 2015 accidentally exposed his genitalia.

== See also ==
- Dress code
- Exhibitionism
- Voyeurism
