= Current Opinion in Anesthesiology =

- Discipline: Anesthesiology
- Language: English
- Edited by: Kai Zacharowski, Philipp Lirk

Publication details
- History: 1988–present
- Publisher: Lippincott Williams & Wilkins
- Frequency: Bimonthly
- Impact factor: 2.526 (2013)

Standard abbreviations
- ISO 4: Curr. Opin. Anesthesiol.

Indexing
- CODEN: COAUCE
- ISSN: 0952-7907 (print); 1473-6500 (web)
- OCLC no.: 18187359

Links
- Journal homepage; Online access; Online archive

Current Opinion in Anesthesiology is a bimonthly peer-reviewed medical journal covering anaesthesiology. It is published by Lippincott Williams & Wilkins and its inaugural editors-in-chief were Paul G. Barash (Yale School of Medicine) and Hugo Van Aken (University of Münster). The current Editors are Kai Zacharowski (University Hospital Frankfurt, Germany) and Philipp Lirk (Memorial Hermann Hospital and UT McGovern Medical School, Texas Medical Center, Houston, TX, USA). According to the Journal Citation Reports, the journal has an impact factor of 2.526.

== See also ==
- Current Opinion (Lippincott Williams & Wilkins)
