= Current Opinion in Neurology =

- Discipline: Neurology
- Language: English
- Edited by: Richard S.J. Frackowiak

Publication details
- Former name(s): Current Opinion in Neurology and Neurosurgery
- History: 1988-present
- Publisher: Lippincott Williams & Wilkins
- Frequency: Bimonthly
- Impact factor: 4.010 (2017)

Standard abbreviations
- ISO 4: Curr. Opin. Neurol.

Indexing
- CODEN: CONEEX
- ISSN: 1350-7540 (print); 1473-6551 (web)
- LCCN: sn93003117
- OCLC no.: 716432133

Links
- Journal homepage; Online access; Online archive

Current Opinion in Neurology is a bimonthly peer-reviewed medical journal covering neurology. The journal publishes editorials and reviews, but not original research articles. It is published by Lippincott Williams & Wilkins and the editor-in-chief is Richard S.J. Frackowiak (University College London). The journal was established in 1988 as Current Opinion in Neurology and Neurosurgery and obtained its current name in 1993.

== Abstracting and indexing ==
The journal is abstracted and indexed in Index medicus/MEDLINE/PubMed, Science Citation Index, Current Contents/Clinical Medicine, and BIOSIS Previews. According to the Journal Citation Reports and Resurchify, the journal has a 2020 impact factor of 4.88.

== See also ==
- Current Opinion (Lippincott Williams & Wilkins)
