= Crotch =

Part of the human body where the legs join the torso

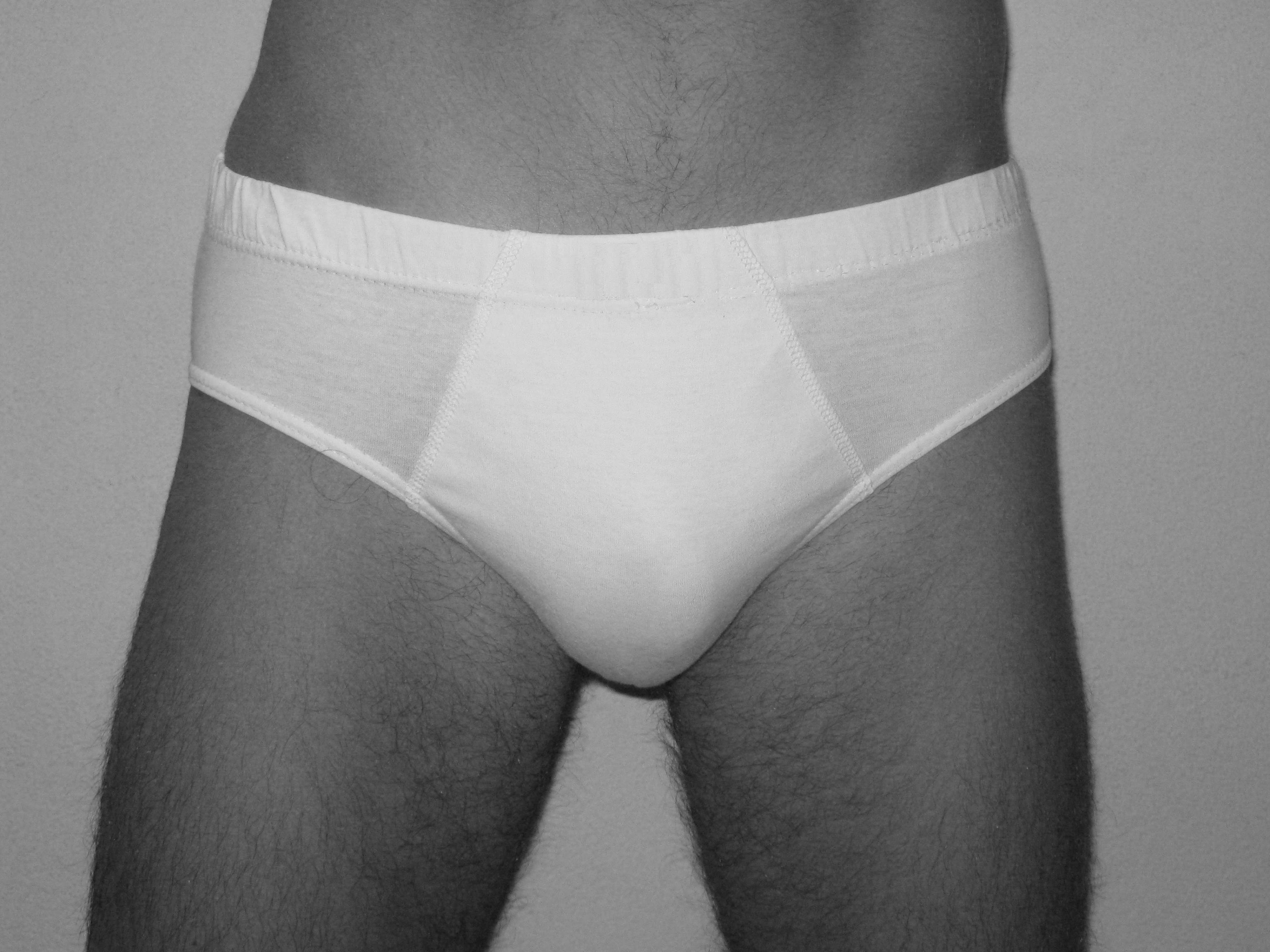
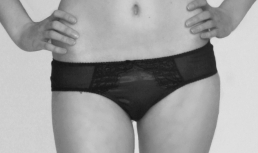
Underpants covering the crotch (front view)

In humans, the crotch is the bottom of the pelvis (the region of the body where the legs join the torso) and is the part of the body that includes the groin and genitals.

== Etymology ==
Crotch is derived from crutch; it was first used in 1539 to refer to a forked stick used as a farm implement. This region of the body is also described with other terms such as groin or the lower ventral area.

== In clothing ==
In clothing, the crotch is the area of trousers, shorts, leggings etc. where the legs join. The bottom of the crotch is an end of the inseam. The crotch-region on smaller garments such as underwear are sometimes referred to as the pouch. Loosely-fitted or bagginess in the crotch-region is sometimes associated with a lax, casual and easy-going approach to attires or garbs.

Clothing that is tight-fitting in the crotch produces an effect that is sometimes referred to by informal terms such as a man-bulge or moose-knuckle on men, and a camel toe on women, especially if the woman's labia majora are conspicuous. Prolonged constrictive pressure of the crotch on the male genitals may increase the likelihood of detumescing. Some men take steps to increase their crotch bulge, either through their choice of clothing or via surgical penis enlargement, in the hope that it will bring them more confidence and self-esteem.

== Scope ==
The semantic field of the term crotch is sometimes expanded to include objects which have shapes similar to that of the anatomical human crotch. This may include botanical structures such as the area where tree branches are joined together or mechanical structures which fork or branch or where ramification takes place. The term had also been expanded to include the joining together of asymmetrical surfaces in cue sports equipment or the corners of flat surfaces usually made of quarried slate.

== Depictions in artwork ==
The human crotch has been depicted in artwork. In Paleolithic art, forms called tectiforms or quadrilaterals have sometimes been interpreted to be "quick visual guides, reminders to the imagination" of the female crotch, and typically do not represent the crotch hairs.

Classical marble statues depict females without pubic hair; in contrast, statues of males "show curly pubic hair".

For much of the history of European art – "until the late seventeenth century" – references to the female crotch were approached from above: "Art usually expressed the sense of the vulva as a point at the bottom of the belly rather than as the meeting place at the top of the thighs."

Art therapists have noted "a triangular or vaginal shaped area in drawings by rape/sexual abuse victims".
