= Crop top =

Top or t-shirt cut shorter than the waist

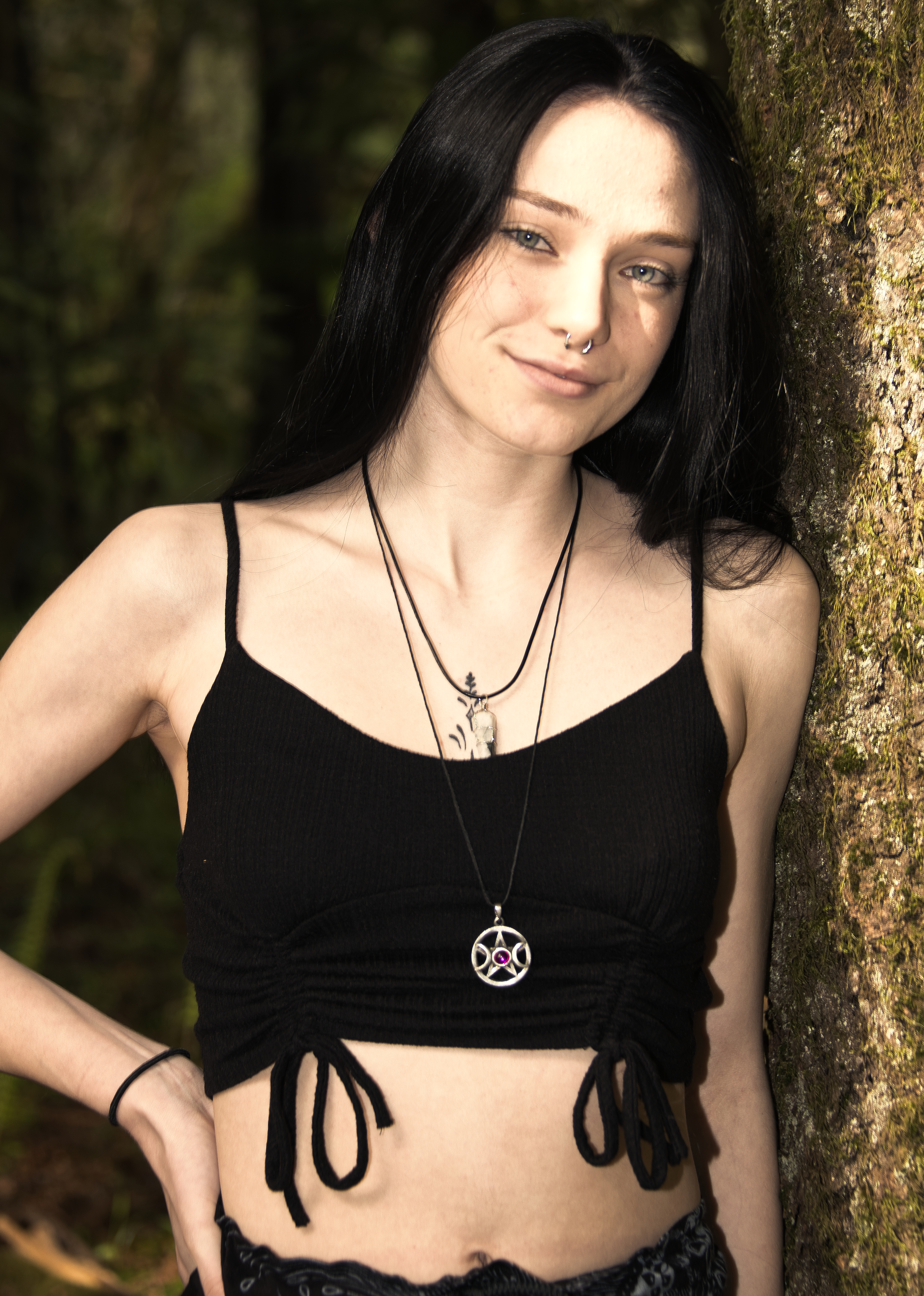
A girl wearing a crop top

A crop top (also half shirt, midriff top, belly shirt or cutoff shirt) is a top that reveals and exposes the waist, navel, or abdomen.

== History ==
=== Women ===
Traditional embroidered Indian choli bodice, Honolulu Museum of Art

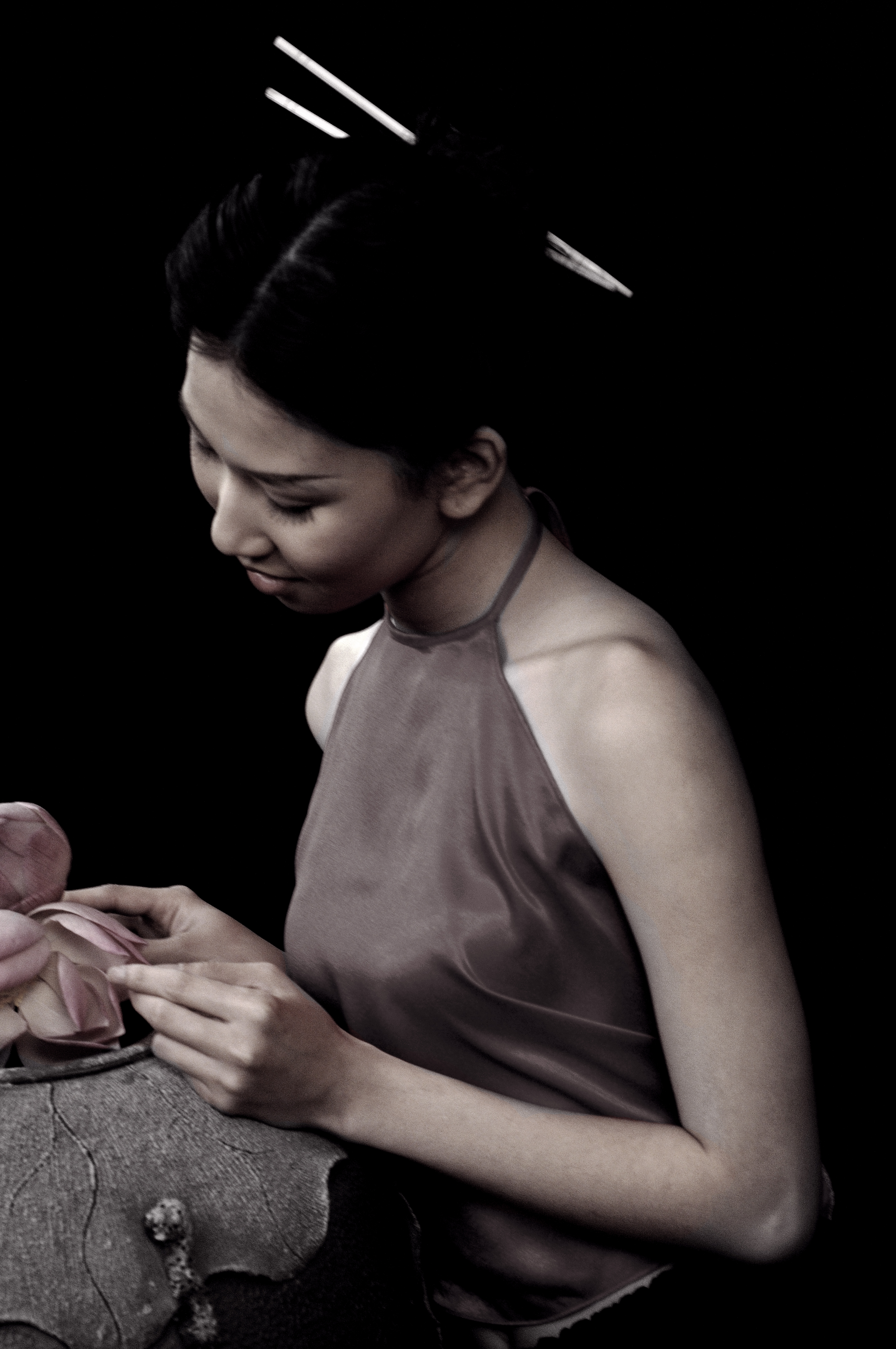
Traditional Vietnamese yếm halter bodice

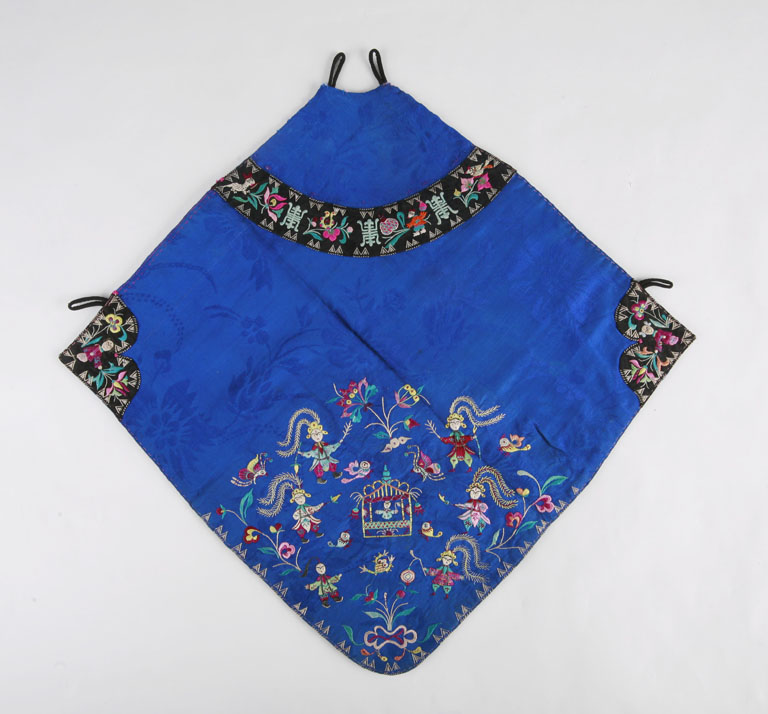
Embroidered Chinese dudou torso covering

The origins of the clothing are unknown, but midriff tops go back to at least the Bronze Age, demonstrated by the discovery of Egtved Girl in Denmark.

Warm climates, textile customs, and regional standards of modesty shaped the independent development of midriff-baring upper garments in a number of non-Western societies long before they were incorporated into contemporary Western fashion.

The choli, also called ravike in South India and polku in Gujarat, evolved as a close-fitting, cropped bodice worn with a sari or ghagra choli in the Indian subcontinent. The choli evolved from the Stanapatta, an ancient and medieval Indian breast-band that was tied in place or left backless. Stitched versions of the garment became widespread between the 10th and 17th centuries, typically ending just below the bust or above the waist to leave the midriff bare. While the cropped "choli" continued to be the norm for both rural and festive wear, Victorian standards of dress during the British Raj encouraged urban elites to wear longer blouses and petticoats.

Halter-style and cropped undergarments served as both warm-weather outerwear and innerwear in East and Southeast Asia. The "dudou," a diamond- or square-shaped cloth tied at the neck and back, became popular in China during the Ming and Qing dynasties to protect the abdomen and flatten the chest. It was occasionally worn as summer outerwear before declining in the early 20th century due to Westernization. From antiquity until the middle of the 20th century, the closely related yếm (also known as "áo yưm") was worn by people of all social classes in Vietnam. It was frequently worn alone by rural women during hot agricultural labor before experiencing a modern resurgence as fashionable outerwear. Women in Java and the surrounding areas of Maritime Southeast Asia traditionally wore short versions of the kebaya that were adapted for humid climates or the kemben, a wrapped torso cloth.

In Egypt and the broader Middle East, the bedlah emerged as a two-piece belly dance costume featuring a fitted, cropped bodice and low-slung skirt designed for cabaret performance. The early history of the modern form of crop top intersects with cultural views towards the midriff, starting with the performance of Little Egypt at the 1893 Chicago World's Fair. Although the crop top first gained prominence in the fashion industry during the 1930s and 1940s—the latter in particular due to fabric rationing in World War II—it was largely confined to women's underwear at the time. It was not until the sexual revolution of the late 1960s and early 1970s that it achieved widespread acceptance, worn by celebrities such as Barbara Eden (star of NBC's I Dream of Jeannie) and Jane Birkin. A variant style, the tied-up top or knotted shirt, also appeared in 1940s fashion and spread in popularity during the 1960s.

In the 1980s, cut-off crop tops became more common as part of the aerobics craze and as a result of the popularity of the movie Flashdance. Singer Madonna wore a mesh crop top in her music video for the song "Lucky Star". In the 2010s, the crop top experienced a revival due to the popularity of 1990s fashion and they still remain popular in the 2020s.

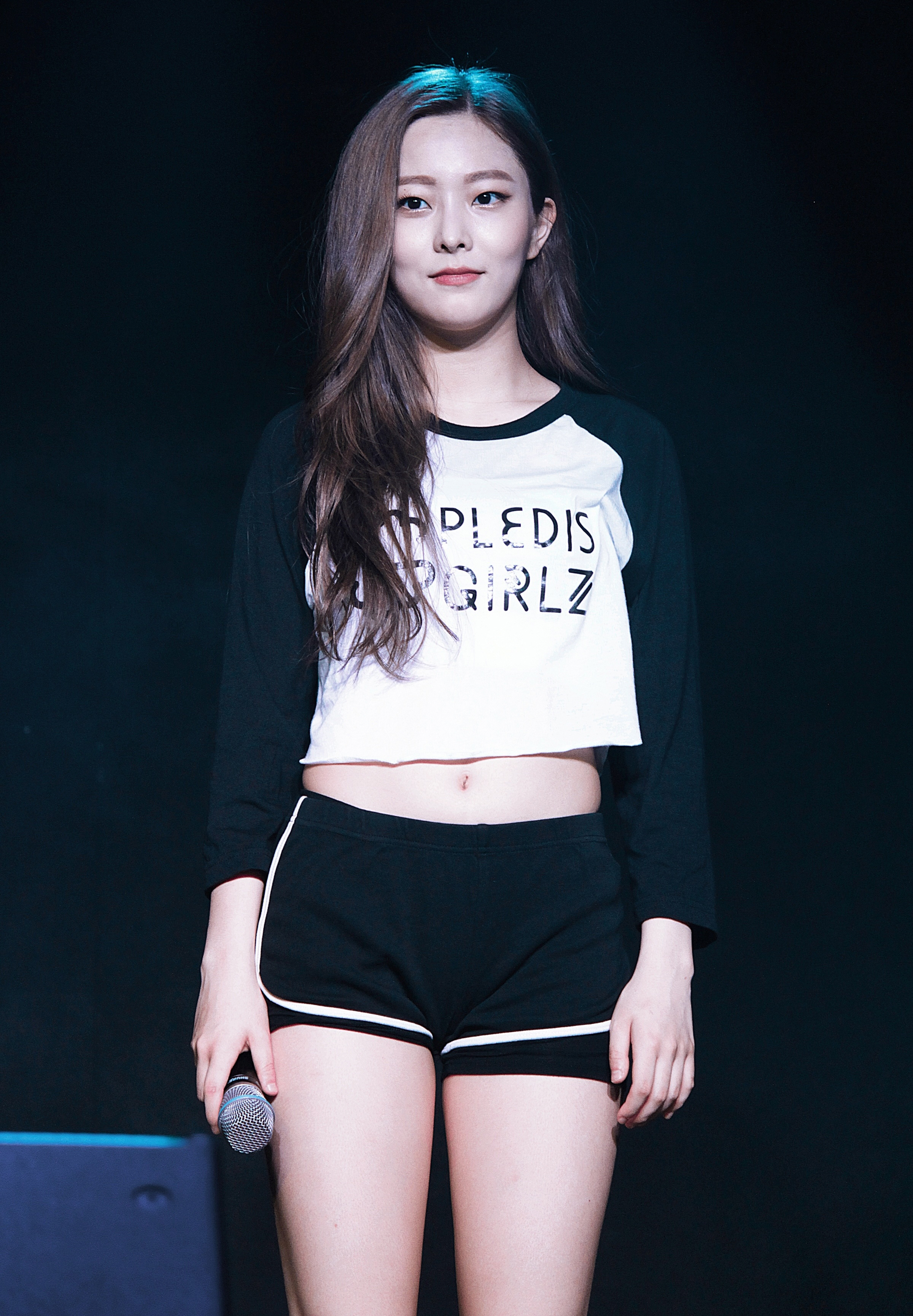
Pristin's Eunwoo wearing a crop top

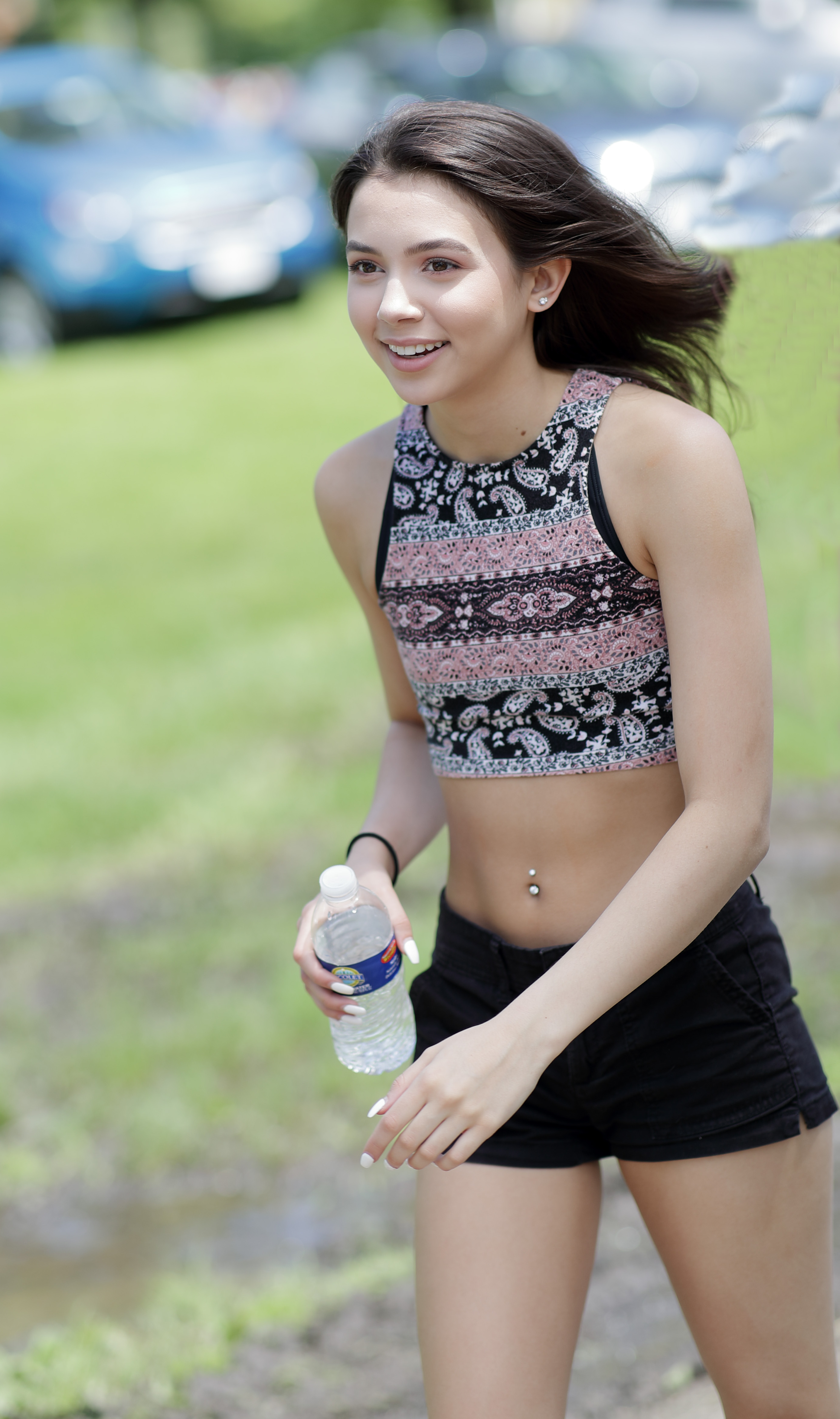
Girl wearing a midriff crop top

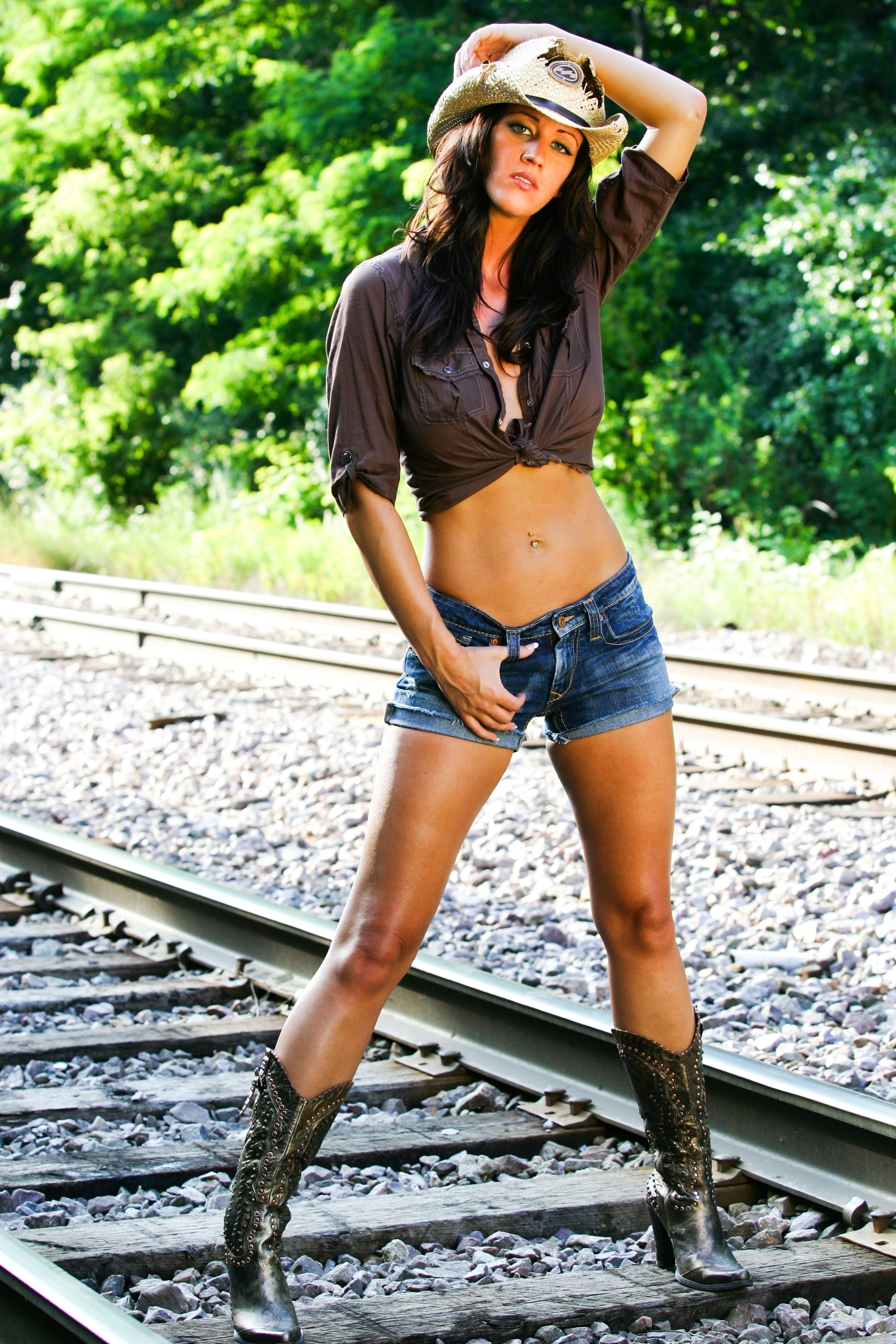
Woman in tied shirt

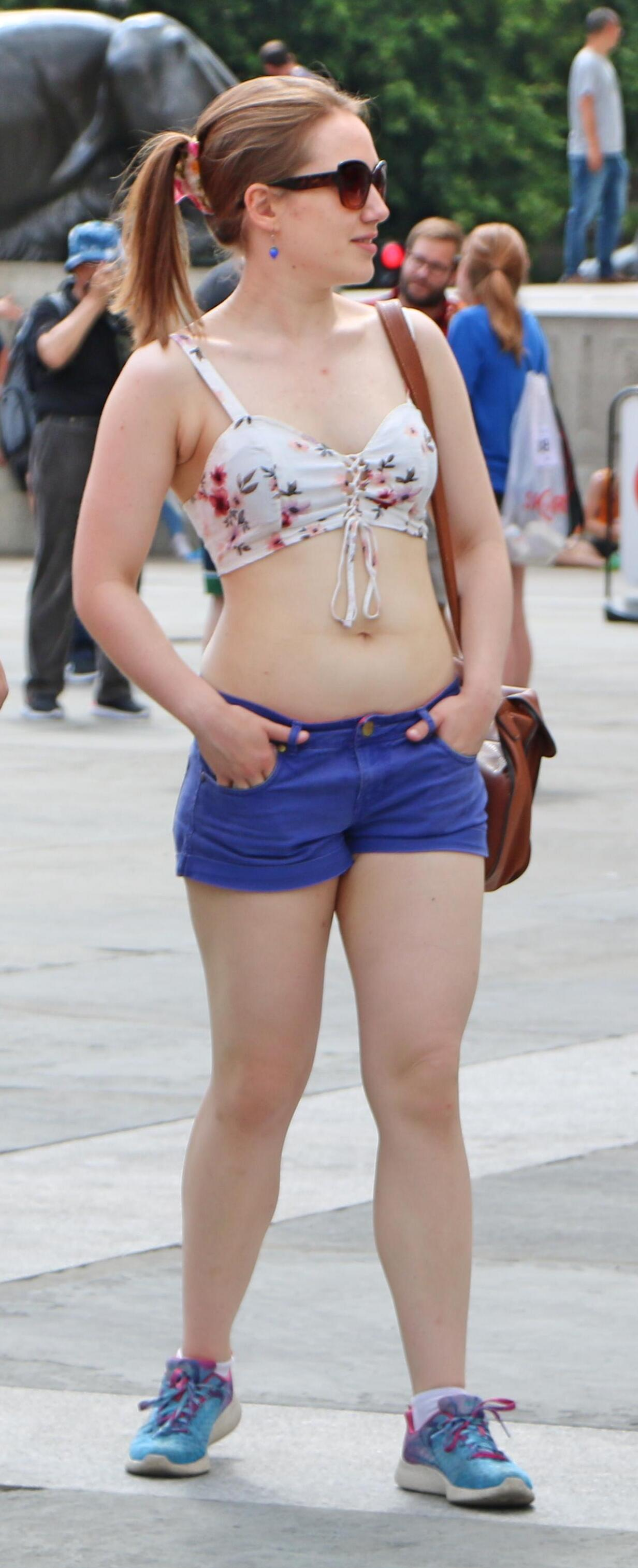
Wearing a bikini/bra as a makeshift crop top and shorts

=== Men ===
Crop tops have been worn by men since the 1970s. In Rocky III Sylvester Stallone is wearing a crop top while working out.

The protective gear of American football with no shirt resembles a crop top. Eventually cropped jerseys became available which carried over to several 1980s broadcasts. Men also started to wear crop tops regardless of sport. Acceptance for men wearing no shirt could be seen to eliminate the need for a crop top. Various crop tops have been worn by rappers as well as American football athletes. However, in 2015, the National Collegiate Athletic Association increased restrictions on men wearing crop tops, which also includes rolling up longer jerseys, giving no reason for the change.

Since the mid-2010s, the male crop top has seen a major resurgence in popularity, including prominent celebrity figures such as football player Ezekiel Elliott, rapper Kid Cudi, rock star Josh Kiszka, and actors Matthew McConaughey and Zac Efron.

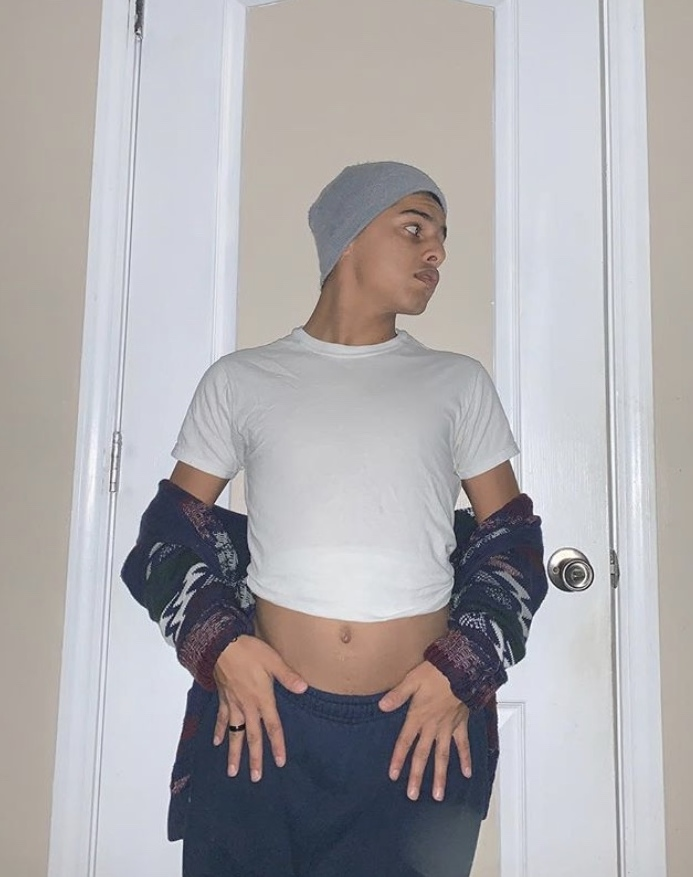
A man wearing a crop top

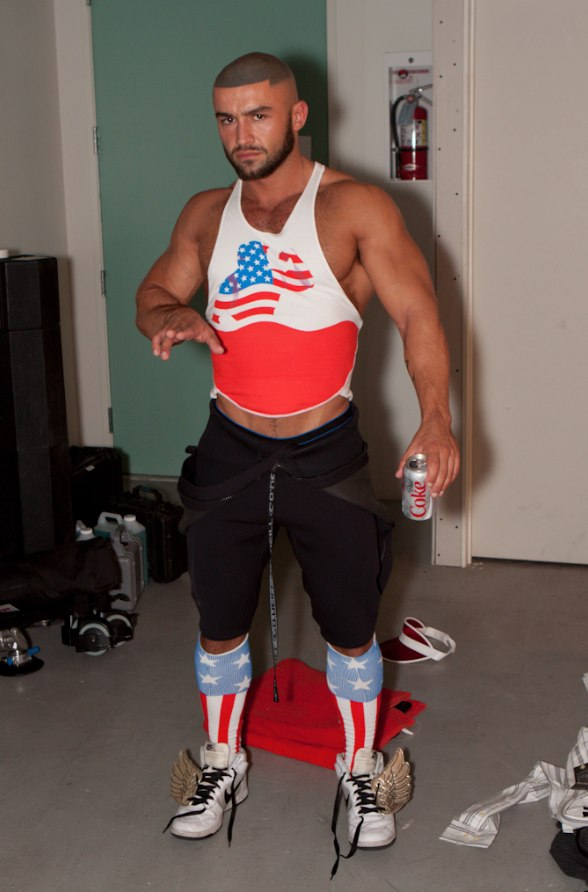
Gay porn star François Sagat wearing a cropped vest

== See also ==
- Dudou, East Asian tops that sometimes function as croptops
- Hip-huggers
- Low-rise pants
- Midriff
- Tube tops
