= Camel toe =

Shape of the vulva in tight-fitting clothes

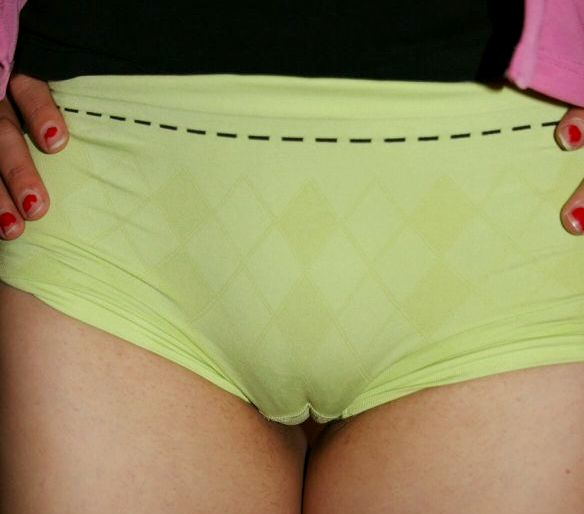
Outline of the labia showing in tight booty shorts

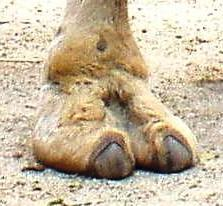
A camel's toes

Camel toe, or cameltoe, is slang for the outline of the labia majora (the outer lips of the vulva) in tightly fitting clothes. Owing to a combination of anatomical factors and the fabric tension in the crotch area, the outer labia and mons pubis may, together, display a shape resembling the forefoot of a camel. Camel toe commonly occurs as a result of wearing clothing with crotch-area vertical tension, such as Spandex activewear or athleisure bottom wear, hotpants or swimwear.

== History ==
In the 1930s, following the development of Lastex rubberized yarns for swimwear, the resulting exposure of the pubic-area outline resulted in manufacturers adding a "modesty panel" to women's swimsuits to conceal the camel toe; this persisted through the 1950s.

In the early 21st century, the display of camel toe in public or in the media has caused controversy on a number of occasions.

== See also ==
- Bralessness
- Modesty
- Whale tail
