= Hip-huggers =

Low-rise trousers or shorts

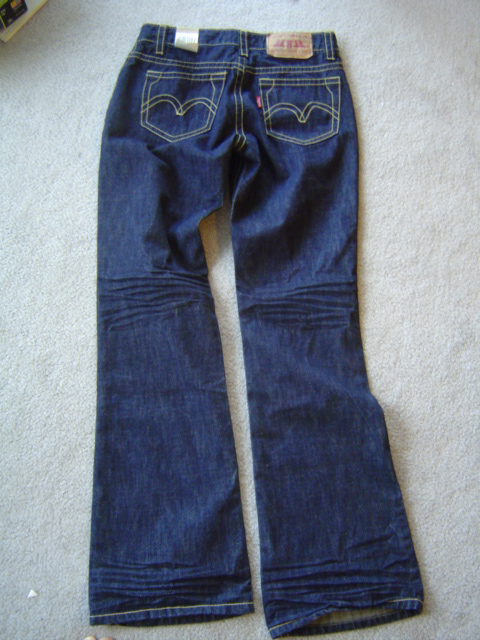
Hip-huggers

Hip-huggers are pants worn by both men and women, generally made of denim and fitted tightly around the hips and thighs, while usually having flared or bell-bottom lower legs. Hip-huggers were first designed by Irene Kasmer in 1957 in Los Angeles, California. They were worn by the mods in the mid 1960s and into the early 1970s. The late 1970s saw the return of hip-huggers in the disco scene. They were also worn, but to a lesser extent, in the early 1980s, but made a reappearance in the 2000s. The hip-huggers of the 2000s were distinguished by the tightness of the knee, as well as the lower rise of the jeans, typically well below the belly button. This is the product of the boot cut style.

The 2000 styles saw pants that were not as low as the ones introduced in 2001, with a kind of "false" hip hugger introduced. The waist was somewhat high with the belt-loops being wide, giving off the illusion of low-cut pants while covering more of the body.
