= 2000s in fashion =

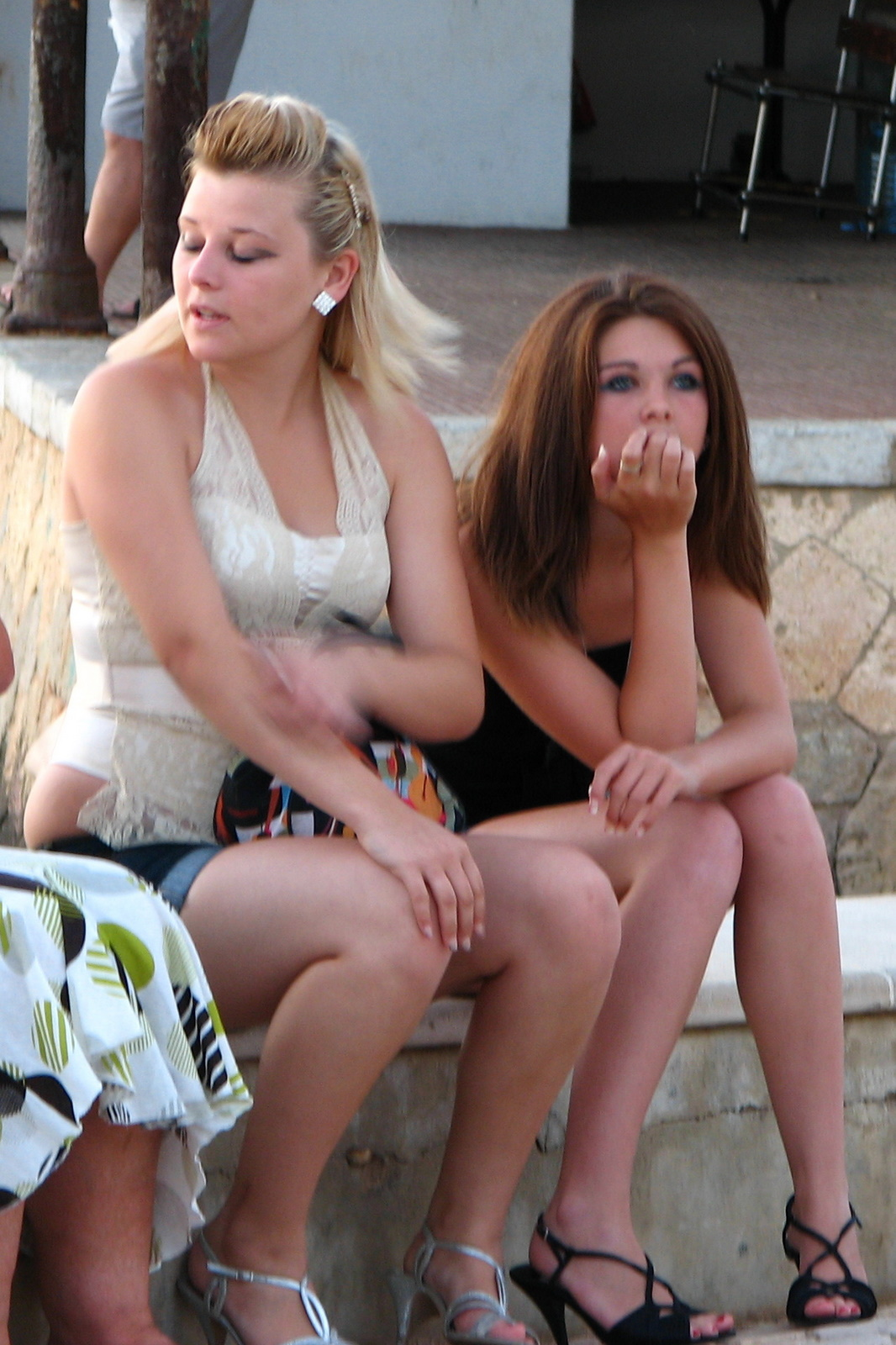
Young women in Portugal with straightened hair and thick makeup in 2007

Fashion in the 2000s was characterized by a combination of vintage styles, global influences, and trends associated with music and popular culture. Hip-hop fashion was widely adopted by young people, while indie-inspired styles gained popularity later. Celebrities also influenced clothing trends through their appearances in magazines, music videos, and public events.

Globalization contributed to the spread of clothing styles from different regions, including elements of Middle Eastern and Asian dress in Western fashion. The decade also saw increased attention to environmentally friendly and ethically produced clothing, including recycled and secondhand fashion.

Many trends from the mid and late 1990s continued into the early 2000s. Later in the decade, fashion increasingly incorporated styles inspired by the 1960s, 1970s, and 1980s.

== General trends ==
=== The rise of fast fashion ===
The early to mid-2000s saw an increase in the popularity of fast fashion: which offered affordable, ready-to-wear clothing inspired by current high fashion designs. The availability of lower-cost clothing and rapidly changing trends contributed to the growth of the fashion industry. Retailers developed new strategies to respond to changing consumer spending habits and demand for more frequent styles.

In 1999, department stores in the United States, such as Macy's, J.C. Penney, and Kohl's, recorded combined sales of $230 billion. During the following years, department store sales declined as online retail and fast-fashion retailers expanded. Companies such as H&M, Forever 21, and Zara became prominent retailers. Target also attracted customers through collaborations with fashion designers, offering designer-inspired clothing at more affordable prices.

Fast fashion made clothing inspired by designer collections more accessible to consumers. It also contributed to the wider production and sale of styles resembling high-fashion designs. In 2004, the retailer H&M, a prominent fast fashion brand, collaborated with fashion designer Karl Lagerfeld on a limited clothing collection. The collaboration was successful and demonstrated the growing relationship between high-fashion designers and mass-market retailers.

Retailers such as Wet Seal and American Apparel were also associated with the development of the American fast-fashion market.

=== Ethics ===
The expansion of fast fashion during the 2000s raised concerns about labor conditions and environmental waste. The rapid production of inexpensive clothing was associated with concerns about low wages, working conditions and the disposal of unwanted items. One estimate reported that American discarded 14 million tons of clothing annually.

Retailers such as Forever 21 and H&M faced criticism over labor practices and the environmental effects of producing large quantities of inexpensive clothing. The frequent introduction of new styles encouraged consumers to replace clothing as trends changed, contributing to concerns about textile waste and the working conditions of workers.

=== The logo purse ===
During the 2000s, the availability of imitation luxury goods increased alongside rising income inequality in Western countries. Consumers purchased both authentic and imitation designer produces, including accessories featuring recognizable brand logos.

Fashion designers increasingly incorporated elements of popular culture and street style into high-fashion collections. This contributed to a blending of luxury fashion and everyday clothing styles. Designer logos became especially visible on accessories such as handbags and sunglasses. Logo-covered purses were worn by celebrities, models, and consumers across different income groups. The availability of imitation products and discount retailers also mader designer-inspired accessories more accessible to a wider market.

=== Vintage clothing ===
During the 2000s, consumers increasingly combined designer clothing with more affordable fashion items. Vintage and secondhand clothing also became more popular in the United Kingdom and the United States. This trend grew following the 2008/9 recession, as some consumers turned to secondhand clothing as an alternative to purchasing new items.

== Women's fashion ==
=== Early '00s Y2K & The Start Of The McBling Era (2000–2003) ===
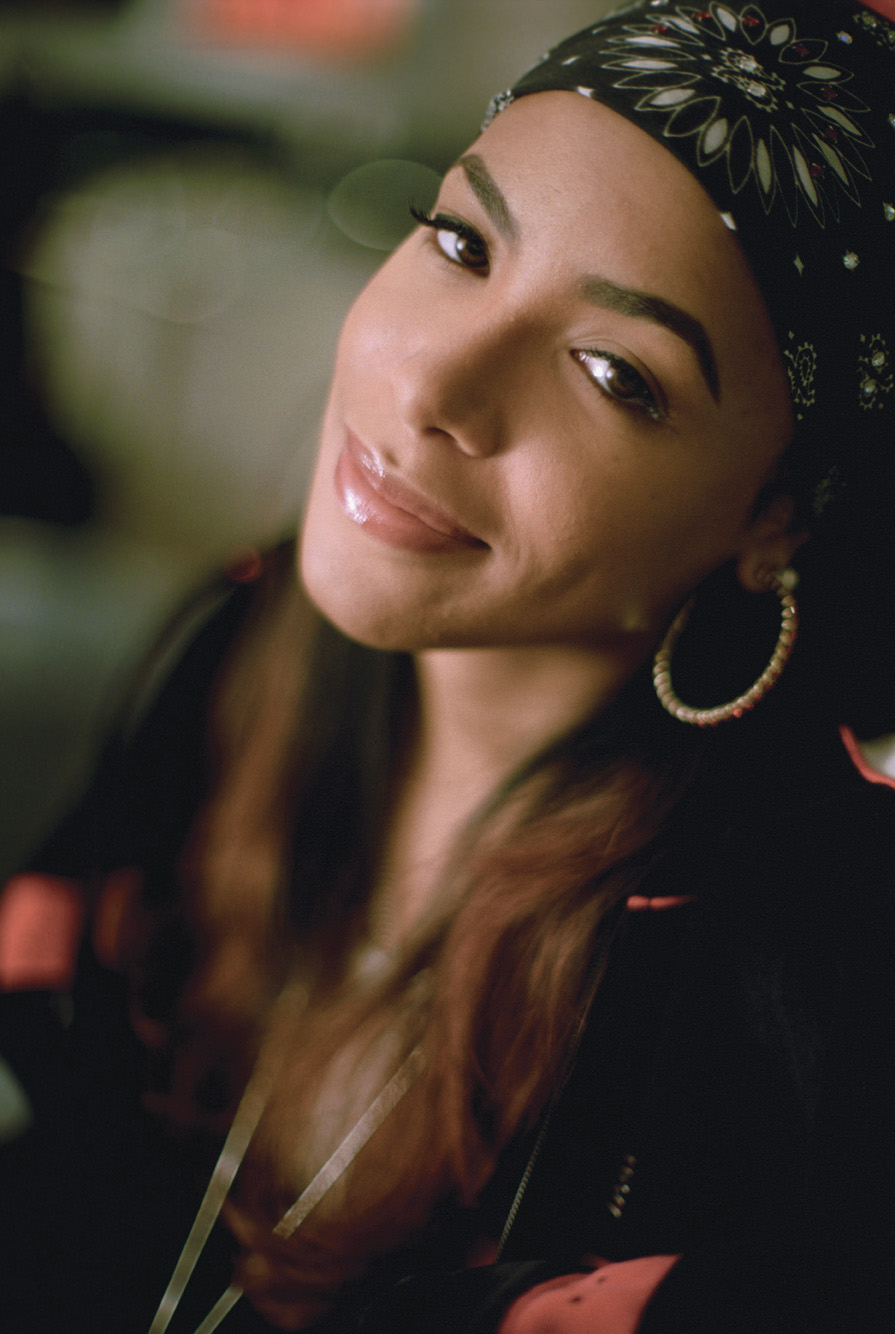
Aaliyah wearing a bandana and hoop earrings in 2000

==== Y2K fashion ====
Fashion in the United States, Britain and Western Europe during the early 2000s was influenced by developments in technology. Y2K fashion featured futuristic designs, including metallic fabrics, black and gray color schemes, straps, and buckles. These styles reflected the growing influence of technology and the futuristic aesthetic associated with the turn of the millennium. The introduction of the original iPod in 2001 also influences fashion, as the device and its white earbuds became recognizable accessories. Tracksuits, low-rise jeans, and oversized sunglasses were among the popular clothing and accessories of the period. Celebrities helped popularize these trends through magazines, music videos, and re-carpet appearances.

Fashion also influenced technology. In January 2015, Google executive Eric Schmidt identified the public interest in the green dress worn by Jennifer Lopez at the 2000 Grammy Awards as an inspiration for the development of Google Images. At the time, Google Search primarily displayed text-based results, and the popularity of searches for Lopez's dress demonstrated the demand for image-based search results.

Other Y2K fashion trends included mesh tops, wraparound sunglasses, rectangular wire-frame glasses, blox-pleated skirts, and metallic handkerchieft tops. Satin and leather skirts, concert T-shirts, rhinsteone-embellished clothing, and decorative shoes were also worn. Sequined pants and embroidered or embellished tops wwere associated with designers such as Peter Morrissey and Easton Pearson. Another notable design was a black dress with a pearl print by Karen Walker, which gained international attention.

In 2000, popular casual clothing and accessories for woman and girls included oversized sunglasses, small should bags, aviator sunglasses, and large hoop earrings. Jeans were worn in several styles, including mid-rise and boot-cut designs, as well as versions featuring decorative stitching, lace-up details, and tie-dye patterns. Other trends included wedge flip flops, hot pants, denim jackets, chunky sweaters, pashmina scarves, Skechers footwear, crop tops, and tube tops.

==== Casual chic ====
In the early 2000s, many fashion trends from the mid and late 1990s continued across Africa, Europe, North America, East Asia, South America, and Oceania. The popularity of teen pop artists such as Britney Spears and Christina Aguilera contributed to the continued influence of earlier styles, including the military-inspired clothing. At the same time, new trends emerged. From 2001 onward, popular women's clothing including bell-sleeved shirts, cowl-neck tops, crop tops, hoodies, flared jeans, hip-hugger pants, low rise trousers, and white jeans. Other trends included whale tails, cargo pants, and hip-hop inspired sweatpants, denim shorts, and brightly colored tights.

The September 11 attacks and the mortgage crisis of 2008 were associated with changed in American fashion during the decade. Denim became increasingly common in a wider range of settings, including casual and formal occasions. Jeans evolved from low-rise styles associated with the early 200s toward different waistlines and leg shapes. The increased visibility of familiar American clothing brands and their logos also became associated with changing consumer preferences during this period.

Distressed denim became popular in the United States between 2001 to 2008, alongside the continued popularity of low-rise and flared jeans. Some styles featured decorative embroidery and other embellishments. In the United Kingdom, women's fashion included skirts worn over trousers, floral-print shift dresses, and clothing in colors such as black, purple and pink. Chunky footwear and sandals with wedge heels were also worn, while previously successful sneaker brands like Skechers declined in popularity.

==== First-wave 1980s revival ====
The revival of 1980s fashion began in the late 1990s and continued into the early 2000s, with an initial focus on styles from the early part of the decade.Popular clothing included denim miniskirts, "distressed" jeans, denim jackets, tracksuits, trench coats, puffy jackets, and polo shirts with raised collars. These styles remained popular into the late 2000s, when interest in other aspects of 1980s fashion increased.

Women and girls in Europe and the United States wore low-top sneakers from brands such as Skechers, Heelys, Adidas, Reebok, and Nike. Knee-high boots with pointed toes and high heels were also popular, alongside boots with lower heels and rounded square toes. Accessories included white belts, aviator sunglasses, trucker hats, hoop earrings, block heeled Mary Janes, leg warmers, Ugg boots, flip-flops, jelly shoes, lace-up sandals, newsboy caps, ponchos, and jelly bracelets.

==== Sex and the City ====
The American television series Sex and the City influenced women's fashion and shopping habits during the 2000s. The show portrayed women with distinct personal styles who selected clothing based on individual preferences. The character Carrie Bradshaw was particularly associated with the popularity of Manolo Blahnik shoes. Other trends connected to the show included high-heeled shoes, designer handbags, large fabric flowers, and berets.

=== Mid-'00s McBling Era & Boho-chic (2004–2007) ===
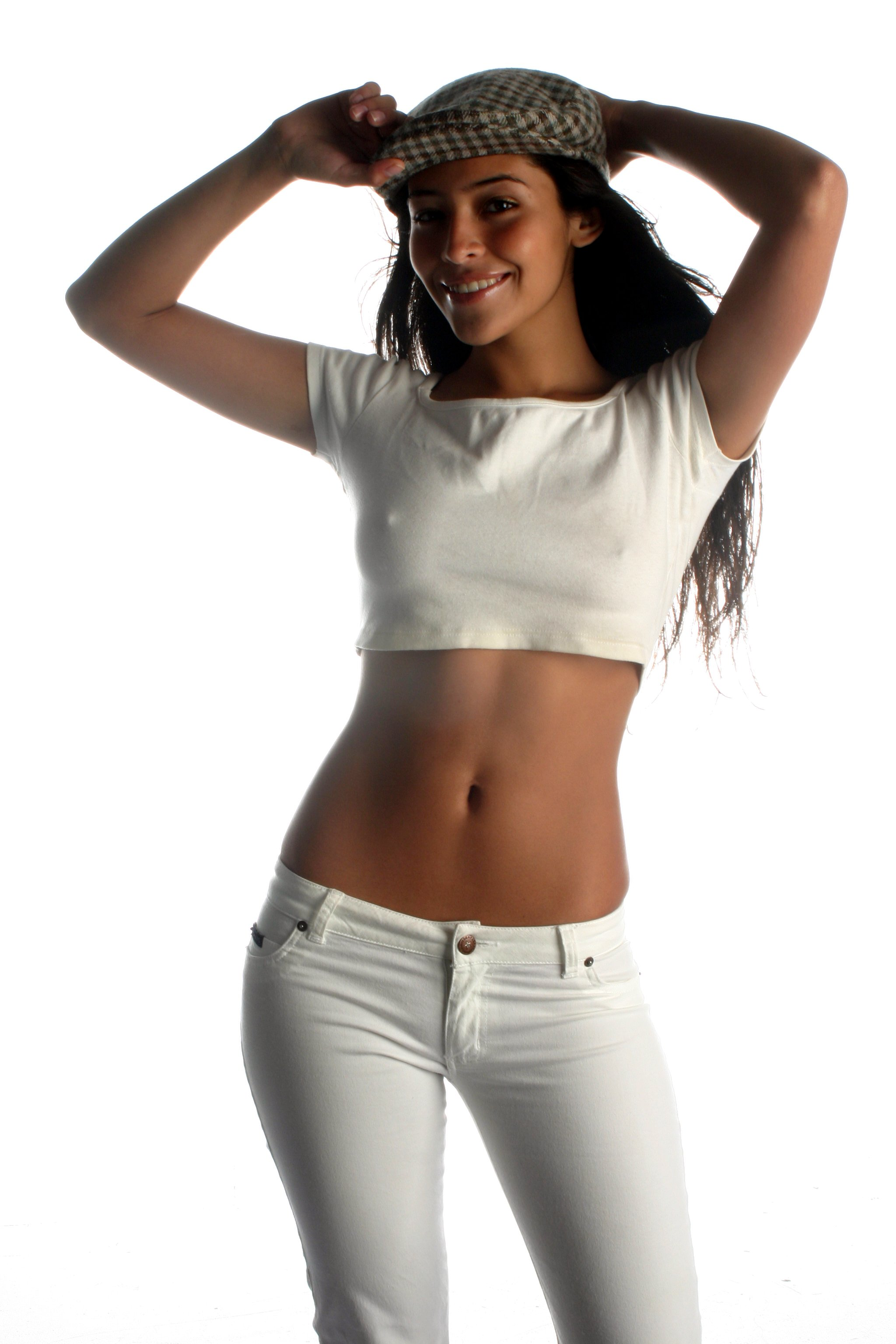
Model wearing low-rise jeans, a newsboy cap, and a belly shirt. (2005)

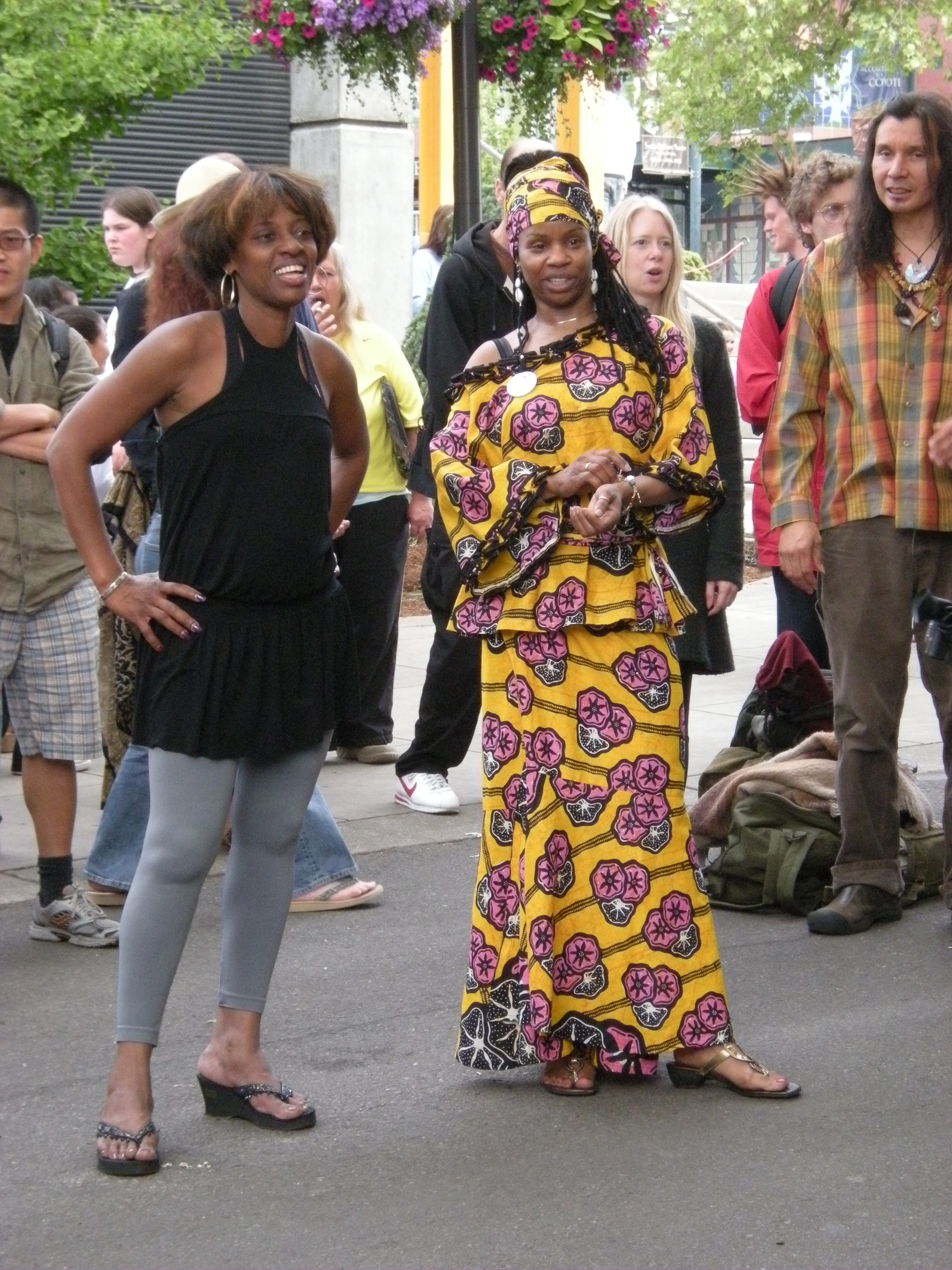
Young woman wearing dress made from African patterned fabric in 2008.

==== It items and 1960s revival ====
Certain designer produces became highlight sought after during the early and middle years of the 2000s. Popular items included Kate Spade wallets, Prada sneakers, Dior saddle bags, designer jeans from brands such as True Religion and 7 for all Mankind, Juicy Couture velour tracksuits, Balenciaga cargo pants, Von Dutch trucker hats. The collaboration between Takashi Murakami and Louis Vuitton also attracted attention for its handbag designs.

Women's fashion during the middle of the decade included embroidered low-rise jeans, yoga pants, cowl-neck tops, tube tops, denim jackets, bell-sleeved shirts, jean shorts, crop tops and tracksuits. Other popular clothing included cargo pants, capri pants, trench coats, puffy jackets, leggings, tunics worn with wide or narrow belts.Vintage-inspired clothing also became popular, particularly dressed influenced by hippie and bohemian styles and featuring dresses with paisley patterns. Crocs became a popular footwear trend during the summer of 2006, while minidresses also returned to fashion.

Skinny jeans, introduced in 2005, gained popularity in 2006. Ballet flats, Sperry Top-Siders, Converse Chuck Taylor All Stars, and Keds were among the footwear styles worn during this period.

Popular accessories included trucker hats, aviator sunglasses, small drop earrings, jelly bracelets, knee-high boots, Uggs, Heelys, platform boots, ballet flats, Mary Janes, and studded belts, black nail polish, large belt buckles, small leather handbags, and scarves. Jewelry made from materials such as hemp, wood, sea shells, glass, and seeds was also worn. Beaded jewelry and accessories influenced by African, Native American, Indian, and Middle Eastern styles appeared in fashion during the decade.

==== Military influences ====
From 2005 through the end of the decade, military-inspired clothing became a popular trend for both mean and women in Britain. The popularity of the Pirates of the Caribbean films and renewed interest in 1980s fashion contributed to the use of military-inspired details and historical clothing styles. Among younger women, popular items included cavalier boots, Greek fisherman's caps, anchor-themed jewelry, fitted leather-look trousers, satin shirts, sashes, harem pants, and braided jackets. Some designs featured epaulets inspired by military uniforms. Small epaulets also appeared on men's shirts.

==== African clothing ====
Women's clothing in Africa during the middle and late 2000s included traditional garments made from brightly colored kente cloth or mudcloth. Other garments included the boubou, pagne, and doek. Secondhand Western clothing donated by British and America charities was also distrubuted in several African countries.

In Tanzania and Kenya, imported secondhand clothing, commonly known as mitumba, had been available since the economic liberalization of the early 1990s. These garments were sometimes preferred over newly manufactured textiles because of their construction quality and recognizable brand labels.

=== Late '00s The End Of McBling & 1980s Revival (2008–2009) ===
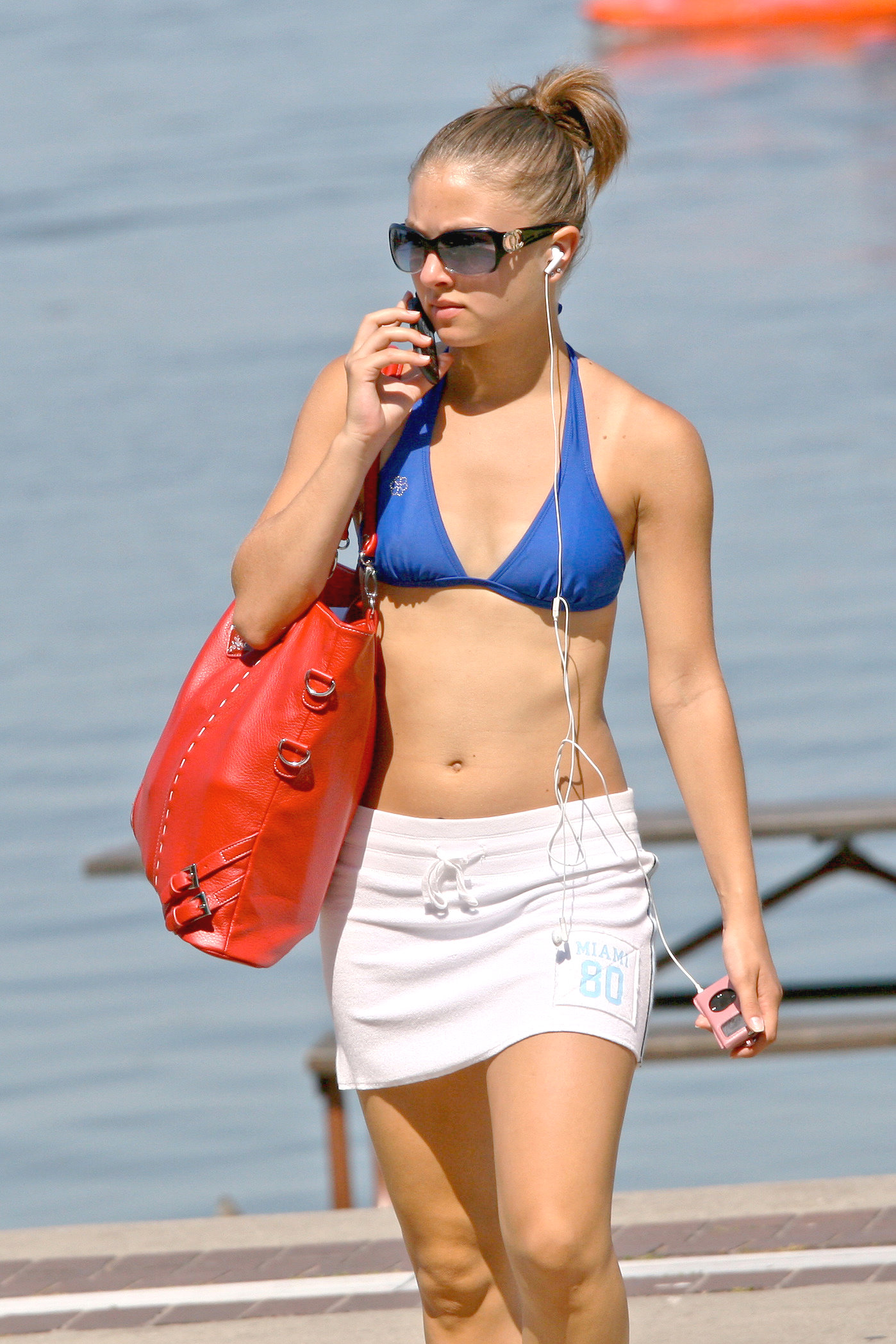
Young American woman in 2007 during the mid-2000s wearing a white miniskirt, a blue bikini top, and sunglasses a brief example how mid-2000s fashion still remained fashionable until 2008

==== Carry-over styles ====
Many fashion trends from the middle of the decade continued into 2008, while newer styles also emerged. Continuing trends included denim miniskirts, whale tails, hip-hugger pants, boot-cut jeans, tank-tops, distressed jeans, low-rise trousers, hoodies, cargo pants, white belts, cropped jackets, capri pants, bohemian clothing, and Crocs.

==== Second-wave 1980s revival ====
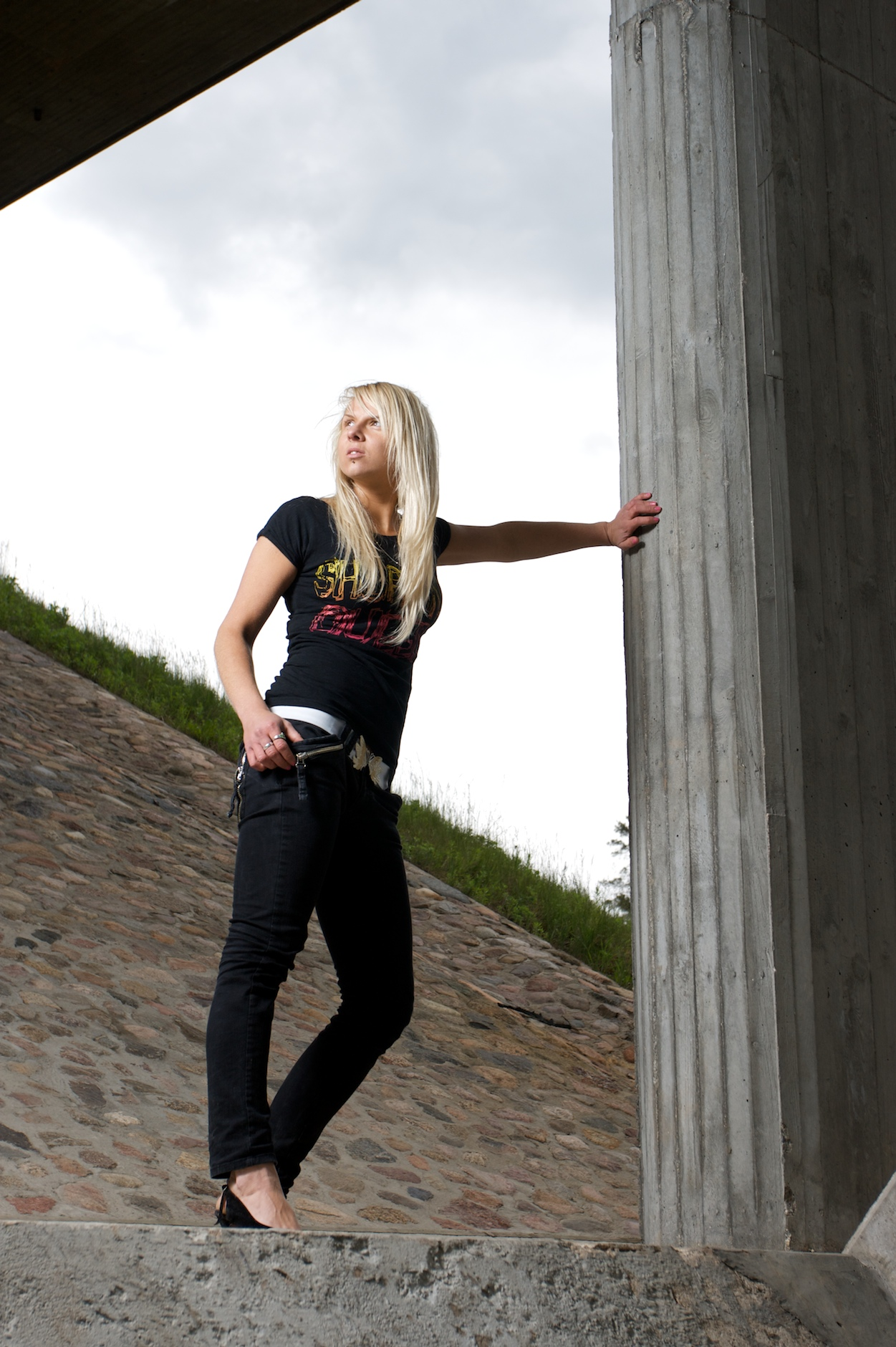
Young woman in summer 2009 wearing all black clothes

During the late 2000s, fashion in Europe and the United States saw another revival of styles from the 1980s and early 1990s. Popular trends included gladiator sandals, boat shoes, patterned headbands, knitted sweater dresses, and geometric-print tops. Other styles included jean skirts worn with tights or leggings, ballet flats, jeggings, oversized shirts, and sweaters, worn with leggings. Ripped acid wash skinny jeans, riding boots, and neon leg warmers also became popular.

In the United States, longer camisole tops, boat neck blouses, and mid rise trousers became more common in some women's wardrobes. Shorter crop tops and miniskirts were joined by longer styles, including babydoll dresses, bubble skirts, skater dresses, and sweater dresses. These were often worn with leggings or tights and footwear such as ballet flats,s Keds, Converse Chuck Taylor All Stars and Ugg boots. Empire-waist shirts were also worn with belts. Fur coats returned to fashion, while some consumers chose alternative materials in response to concerns about animal cruelty.

== Men's fashion ==
=== Early '00s (2000–2003) ===
==== Y2K fashion ====
Men's Y2K fashion frequently featured black, silver, gray, and white clothing, particularly in the United Kingdom. Popular items included tracksuits, Rockport boots, dress shirts, trousers, camp shirts, and jackets metallic patterns. Other styles included leather coats and trousers, puffy vests, ribbed sweaters, and chunky dress shoes. These designs reflected the futuristic aesthetic associated with the turn of the millennium. Y2K fashion remained popular from the late 1990s until approximately 2022.

==== Leisurewear ====
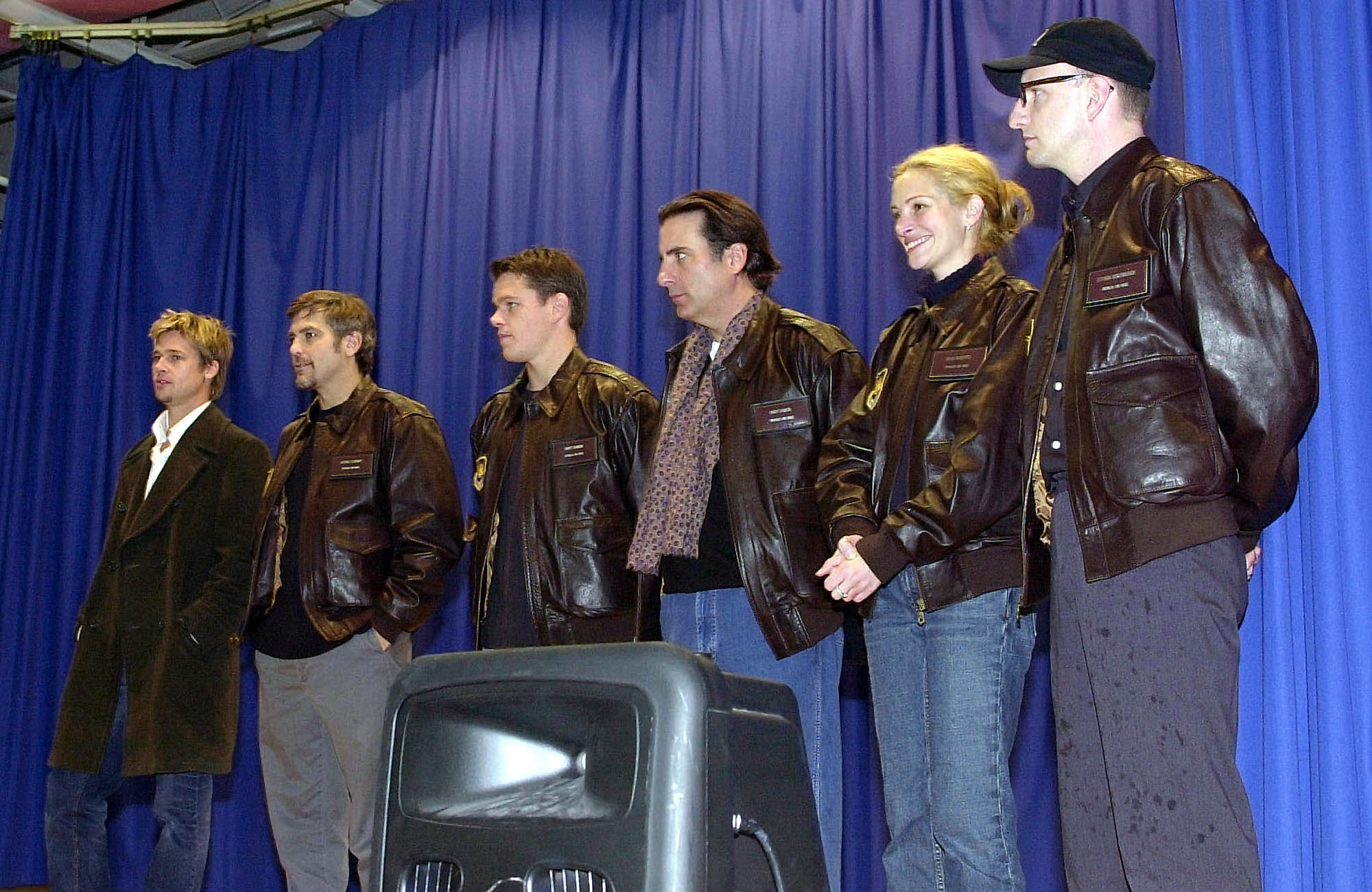
Brad Pitt, George Clooney, Matt Damon, Andy García, Julia Roberts, and Steven Soderbergh wearing brown leather jackets in December 2001

Following the September 11 attacks, American fashion shifted toward more conservative styles, with less emphasis on the futuristic designs associated with the beginning of the decade. Distressed denim became popular, including jeans with sandblasted finishes, faded areas, rips and whiskering. Lower-rise jeans also became more common, replacing many of the high-waisted styles associated with the 1990s.

Many fashion trends from the mid and late1990s continued into the early 200s. Newer styles included sportswear and military-inspired clothing worn as everyday attire. Popular items included tracksuits, light-colored polo shirts, cargo pants, khaki chinos, boot-cut jeans, corduroy trousers, and rugby shirts. Winter clothing included hiking jackets, fleeces, puffer jackets, padded flannel shirts, and turtleneck sweaters. Sport coats in navy, gray, beige, and natural linen were also worn. Many of these styles continued into the middle of the decade.

Men's accessories included white belts, Aviator sunglasses, trucker hats, flip-flops, Oxford shoes, argyle socks, which were sometimes worn over tracksuit bottoms. Rockport boots and sneakers from brands such as Nike, Adidas, and Puma were also popular. Baseball caps featuring the logos of professional football, soccer, basketball, and baseball teams were common.

=== Mid-'00s (2004–2007) ===
==== 1960s revival ====
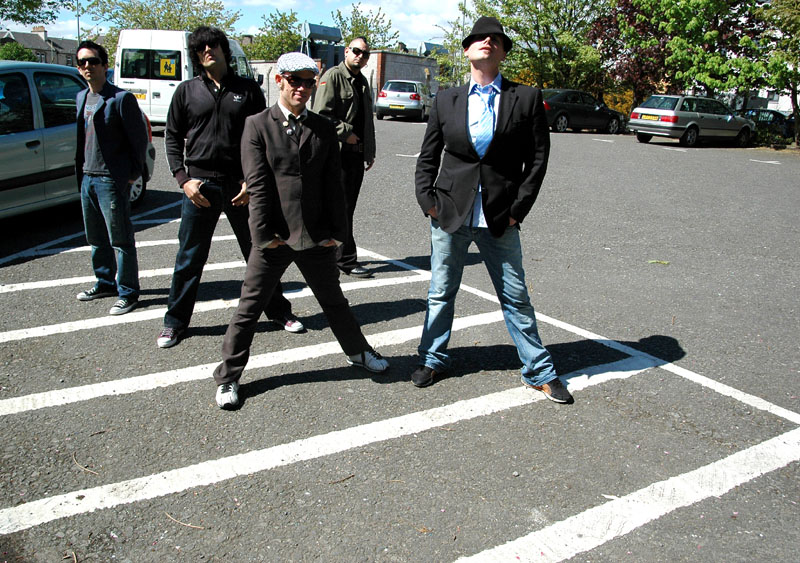
Californian band Orson in 2006 wearing mid 1960s-inspired apparel

During the mid-2000s, retro fashion influenced by British indie pop, garage rock revivalist bands, and 1960s mod culture gained popularity. Between 2004 to 2007, common men's clothing in the United States and Europe included light-wash bootcut jeans, wide-leg trousers, cargo pants, cargo shorts, and patterned camp shirts. Other styles included vintage Classic rock T-shirts, throwback sports uniforms, and shirts featuring retro advertisements or street art, Military surplus clothings, paisley shirts, velvet sport coats, parkas, windbreakers and Harris tweed jackets were also worn. Fitted Western-style shirts inspired by 1970s fashion, including designs with pearl snaps, gained attention through musicians such as the White Stripes.

==== Retro movie inspirations ====
Men's fashion in the United States during 2003 was influenced by films from the 1960s and 1980s. Movies such Top Gun, Bullitt, and Midnight Cowboy contributed to the popularity of several styles. These included Henley shirts, muscle shirts, hoodies, cargo pants, American football shirts, aviator jackets, cable-knit sweaters, khaki trousers, seersucker suits, Western shirts, blazers, and pea coats.

Popular men's accessories during the middle of the decade included black brogue shoes, square-toed ankle boots, Adidas sneakers, loafers, Oxford dress shoes, Converse All Stars, and flip-flops. Other accessories included chokers, puka shell necklaces, shell bracelets, hemp jewelry, charity bracelets, trucker hats, and earrings.

==== Business suits ====
In the United Kingdom, me's workplace fashion commonly included, black, navy and charcoal three-button pinstripe suits. From 2003 to 2006, Nehru suits and mandarin collar shirts also became popular alternatives, influenced by music, film, and science fiction.

In the United States, men increasingly wore smart-casual clothing in some professional settings. Common styles included striped dress shirts, flat-front charcoal chinos, beige cardigans, argyle sweaters, leather blazers, and houndstooth sport coats.

=== Late '00s (2008–2009) ===
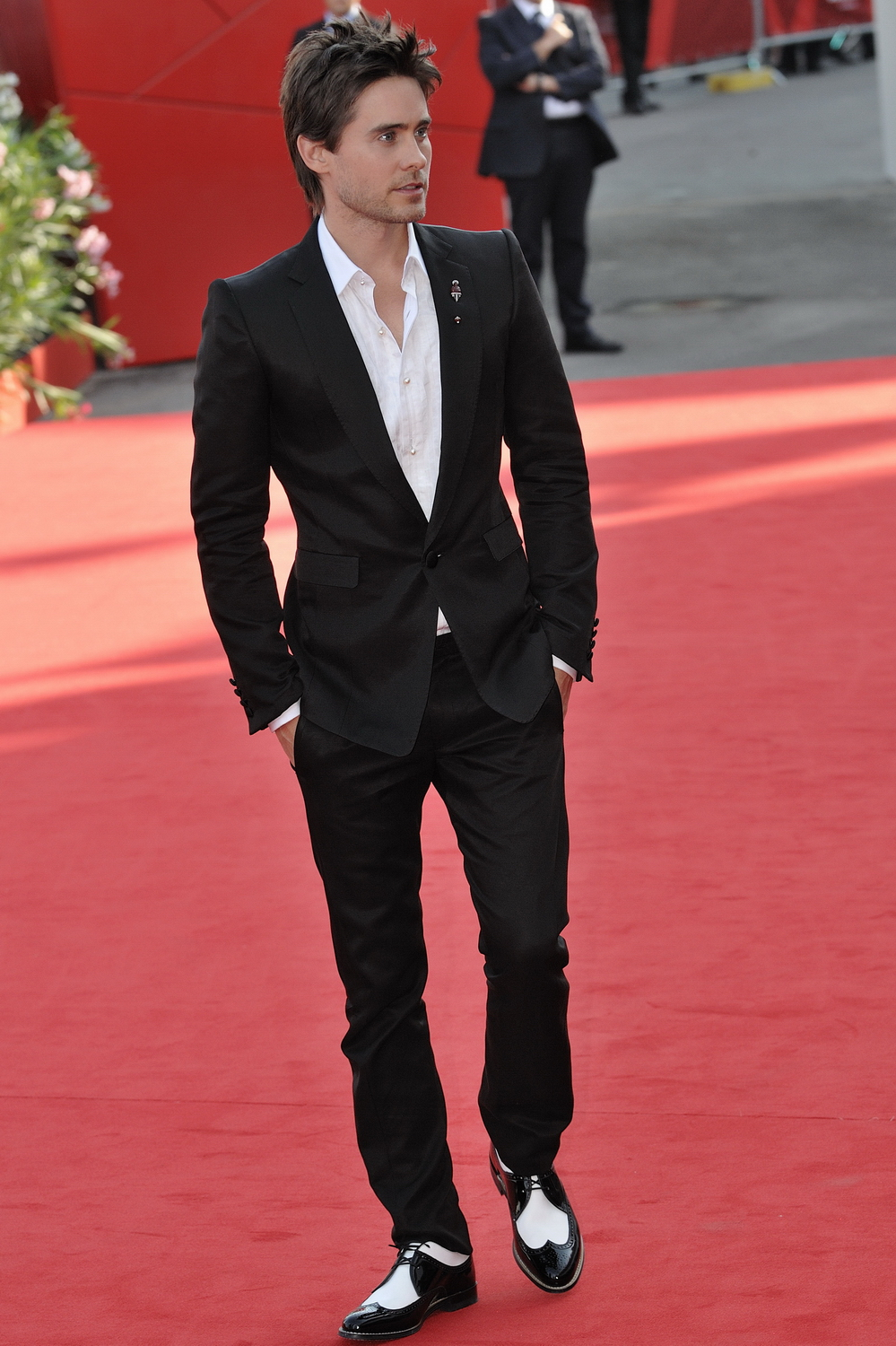
Jared Leto wearing slim-fit formal wear; Popular 2008–onwards.

==== Throwback fashions ====
During the late 2000s, men's fashion incorporated styles inspired by the 1950s and 1980s. Popular clothing included letterman jackets, black leather jackets, windbreakers, dashiki, Hawaiian shirts, ski jackets, slim-fit and straight-leg jeans, and wool topcoats. Other trends, included low-neckline graphic T-shorts, cardigans and knitted V-neck sweaters.

Common accessories included wristwatches from brands such as Patek Philippe, Casio G-Shock and Rolex, as well as Ray Ban Wayfarer and Aviator sunglasses. Horn-rimmed glasses were also associated with the geek-chic trend. Popular footwear in Europe and America included Sperry Top-Siders, Keds, motorcycle boots, Nike Air Jordans, checkerboard Vans, and Converse All-Stars.

==== Ed Hardy ====
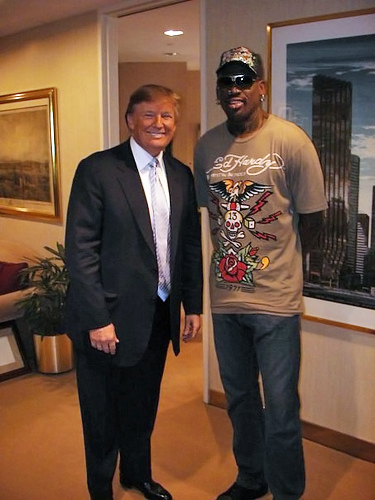
Dennis Rodman wearing an Ed Hardy shirt, and Donald Trump wearing a navy blue two button suit in 2009

During the late 2000s, clothing featuring tatto-inspired designs became popular in the United States, Britain, and India. T-shirts, baseball caps and hoodies featuring these designs were often worn with black leather jackets, oversized belt buckles, gold chains, and dark slim-fit jeans. The trend associated with celebrity figures such as Jon Gosselin and the cast of Jersey Shore.

V-neck T-shirts and graphic-print hoodies also became popular among younger British men. Ed Hardy T-shirts, which often featured tattoo-inspired artwork and rhinestones embellishments, were particularly fashionable from late 2008 into the mid-2010s. The brand later became associated with particular nightlife and youth subcultures, which contributed to changed in its public image.

==== Slim-fit suits ====
In European workplaces, men's suits changed in style during the late 2000s. The three-buttoned jackets common in the 1990s were increasingly replaced by two-buttoned suits influenced by 1950s designs. These outfits generally included matching trousers and fitted blazers. In the United States, the power suit also returned to popularity.

Some European single-breasted suits featured contrasting piping inspired by Edwardian fashion. They were often worn with slim ties and waistcoats.

== Youth fashion ==
Youth fashion during the 2000s was influenced by several music and lifestyle subcultures. These included emo, indie, scene, psychobilly, preppy, skater, goth, nu metal, raver culturesrs, as well as hip-hop. Regional styles included the British chav subculture, American gangsta rap fashion and Mexican Cholo fashion.

=== Hip-hop ===
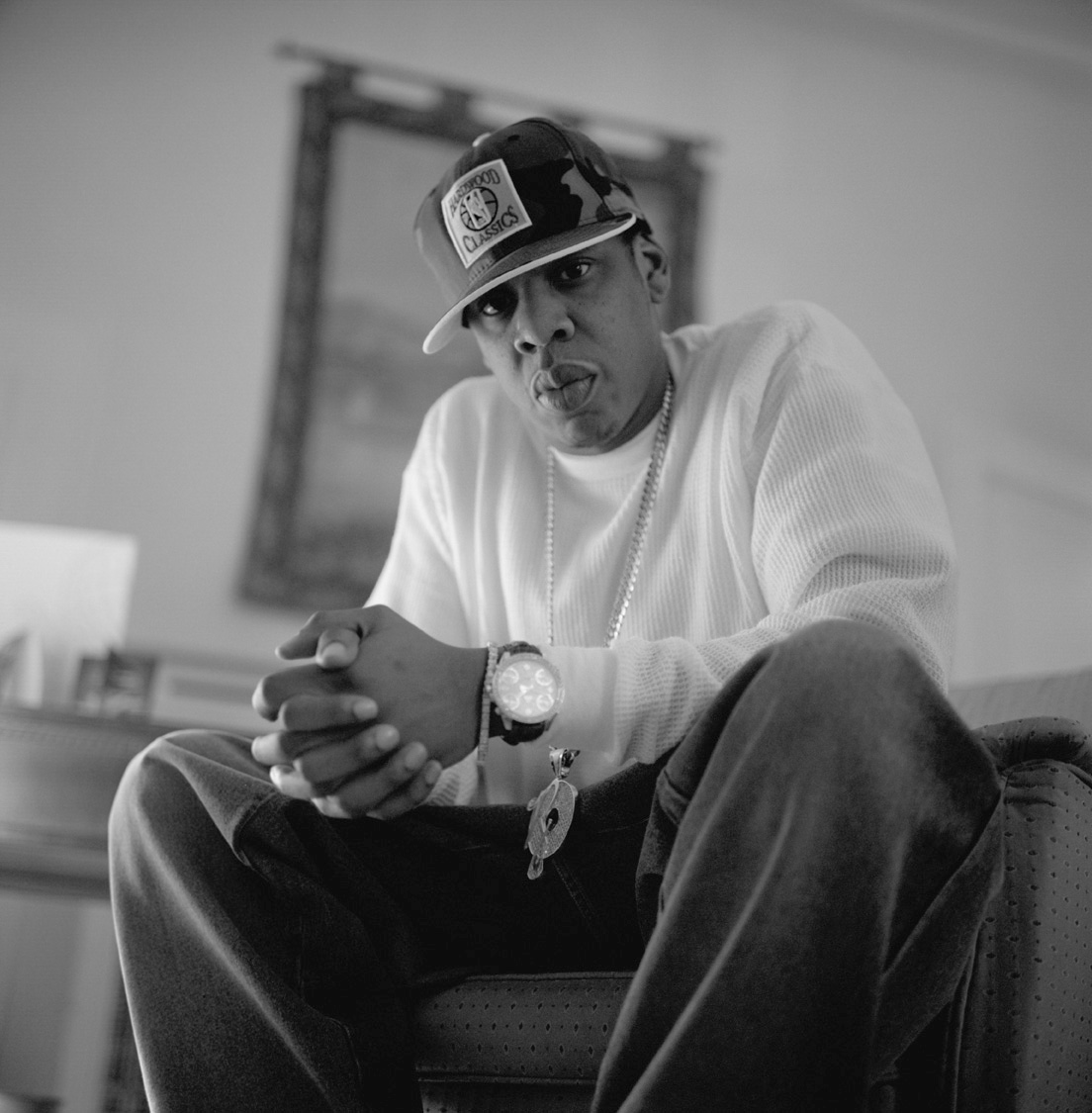
American rapper Jay-Z in 2003

The clothing worn by American hip-hop fans evolved during the 2000s, moving from oversized gangster jeans popular in the late 1990s toward more retro-inspired styles by the end of the decade. Common clothing included wide leg jeans, baseball jackets, Nike Air Jordans, tracksuits, sweatpants, bucket hats, sunglasses, fur-lined puffer jackets, and flat-brimmed trucker hats or baseball caps. Some people wore hats with the store labels still attached.

Hip-hop fashion also influenced mainstream youth clothing. Some wealthy white teenagers adopted styles associated with gangsta rap, replacing the more conservative clothing associated with earlier decades with gold jewelry, designer clothing, expesnive sneakers, dark jeans and sweatpants.

Another American subculture included Cholos and Chicanos, whose clothing styles sometimes featured baggy khaki trousers, gold chains, white T-shirts, slicked back hair, and shaved heads. These styles were associated with particular Mexican American communitites and were sometimes influenced by the clothing of Mexican prison gangs.

As hip-hop fashion entered mainstream culture, it continued to emphasize individuality and self-expression. Designers and artists such as Nigo, the founder of A Bathing Ape (BAPE), and Pharrell Williams helped connect hip-hop fashion with skateboarding and streetwear. Oversized clothing remained popular, while the combination of streetwear and designer fashion became increasingly visible.

During the middle and later years of the decade, artists such as Kanye West helped broaden the range of styles associated with hip-hop fashion. His clothing choices included shutter shades and brightly colored polo shirts, challenging some established expectation surrounding masculinity in the genre. His collaboration with Louis Vuitton also demonstrated the growing relationship between hip-hop and luxury fashion. Other artists, including A$AP Rocky, later helped bring designers such as Rick Owens and Raf Simons into hip-hop's fashion culture.

=== Indie and emo ===
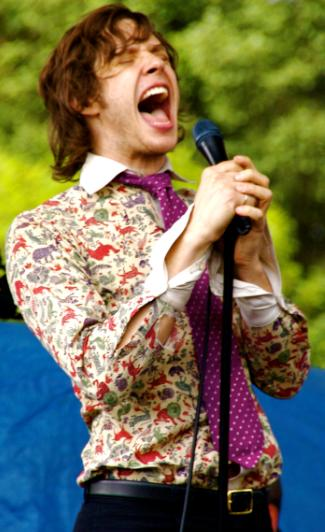
Indie rock singer Damian Kulash wearing psychedelic 1960s-inspired clothing, 2006

In 2005, indie pop fashion became more popular in Europe and North America. The trend contributed to a revival of 1960s mod and British Invasion styles, as well as interest in vintage and secondhand clothing, It also influenced activist fashion, including the use of keffiyeh scarves.

The related hipster subculture emerged in the United States during the late 2000s and early 2010s. Members often wore vintage clothing as part of an aesthetic associated with independent music and alternative culture. Other groups, including American preppies and some hip-hop artists, adopted elements of indie fashion or combined them with Japanese streetwear influences. These included Harajuku and Lolita styles, which also received attention through Gwen Stefani's music and fashion projects.

Emo fashion became especially recognizable during the middle and later years of the decade. Common clothing included black or purple hoodies, band T-shirts featuring groups such as Fall Out Boy, My Chemical Romance, and Taking Back Sunday, and low-rise skinny jeans. Some people also wore snakebite piercings, silver jewelry, and checkerboard-pattern Vans shoes. Hairstyles typically featured straight, flat hair with long bands or fringe, often dyed black.

=== Preppy ===
Late 2000s for preppy fashion for American girls combined traditional clothing with trends from popular youth fashion. Common footwear included ballet flats, Converse sneakers, Ugg boots, flip flops, and riding boots, sometimes worth with knee socks or leg warmers. Popular clothing included pleated skirts from brands such as Abercrombie & Fitch, babydoll dresses, bubble skirts, denim skirts, and skirt-and-legging combinations.

Other styles included sweater dresses, belted shirt dresses, opaque tights, oversized shirts, sweaters, and sweatshirts worn with leggings. Argyle-patterned sweaters, knee socks, headbands, cardigans, skinny jeans, and colored jeans were also popular. Additional trends included translucent tartan shirts worn over camisoles, cropped sweaters, jeggings, brightly colored socks, dress shorts, and head wraps.

Preppy fashion for boys included polo shirts, sometimes layered over long-sleeved shirts, baseball jackets, cardigans, madras plaid shirts, sweater vests, Oxford shirts, and khaki chinos. Popular footwear included Sperry Top-Spiders, Keds, Hunter rain boots, and white sneakers from brands such as Nike and Converse. Clothing from brands such as Hollister and Old Navy was also associated with this style.

== 2000s beauty trends ==
=== Hairstyles ===
==== Women ====
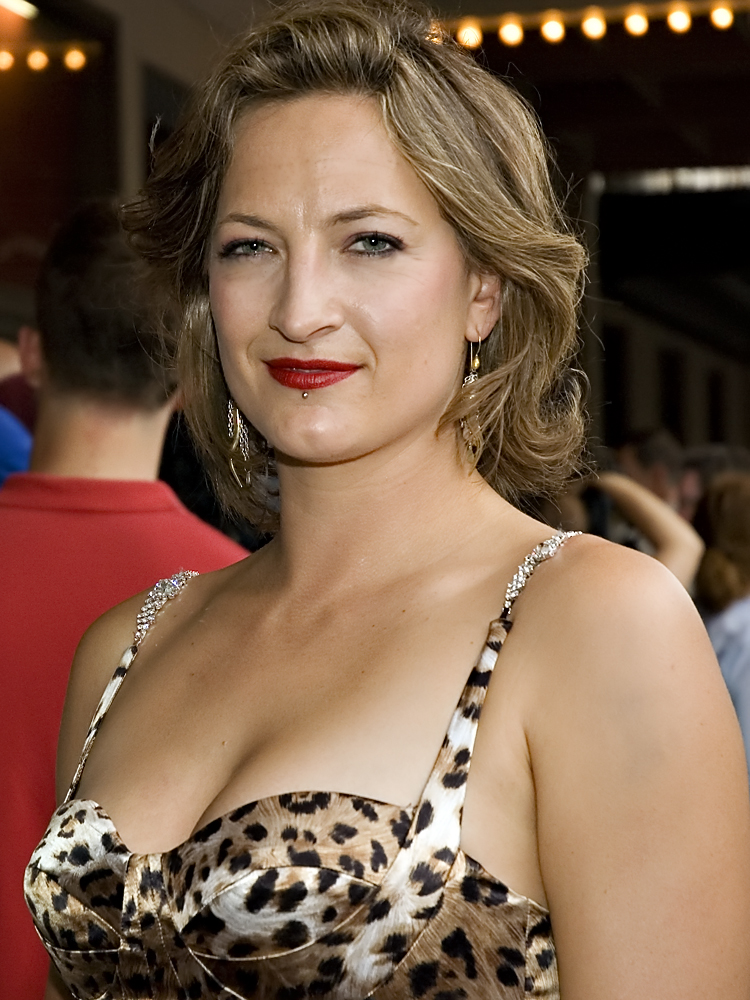
Zoë Bell in 2006 sporting a medium length hairstyle and blended highlights

Women's hairstyles during the early 2000s often featured long, straight hair. Zigzag partings, in which the hair was divided into a distinctive zigzag pattern, were also popular. Hair lengths ranged from short styles ending below the ears to longer cuts reaching the shoulders.

From the mid 1990s through 2008, highlights and lowlights in blonde, red, and light brown shades became common. In 2000, these were often subtle and blended to create a sun-lightened appearance By 2002, more noticeable "chunky highlights" became popular. Singer Kelly Clarkson helped bring attention to the trend through her appearance on American Idol. The style remained popular until approximately 2006. The revival Farrah Fawcett-inspired hairstyles from the late 1990s also contributed into the early 2000s. Crimped hair was another popular style during the early and middle years of the decade.

Among Black women, cornrows, dreadlocks and curly weaves were popular throughout much of the decade. Toward the end of the 2000s, variations of the Afro, Jheri curl and short pixie cuts received renewed attention through artists such as Janet Jackson and Rihanna. Braided hairstyles also remained popular, with artists including Alicia Keys and Lauren Conrad helping bring attention to different styles. Braids and plaits were sometimes arranged in intricate patterns and coordinated with clothing.

During the middle of the decade, the bob haircut and its longer variation, the long bob or "lob" became popular among women. By the late 2000s, side-swept bands became more common, replacing some of the center-parted styles associated with earlier years.

Dark hair, including jet-black styles, became popular in the late 2000s. Celebrities such as Katy Perry and Amy Winehouse influenced the trend, with Winehouse particularly associated with herbeehive hairstyle. Textured hair, natural waves, and bob cuts also remained popular from 2007 onward. In 2009, Kate Gosselin's short hairstyle with blended highlights received attention and briefly influenced women's hair trends. Other popular styles included headbands, scruncies, side ponytails, and braids worn along one side of the head.

==== Men ====
In the early 2000s, European men between the ages of 25 and 40 often wore shorter hairstyles, including the quiff. Younger men also wore spiked hair and fauxhawks. Some young British men with dark hair added blond highlights or dyed sections, although natural hair colors became more common again toward the end of the decade. In the United States, frosted spiky hair remained popular among boys and young men, influenced by boy bands and pop-punk musicians.

From 2003 to 2006, longer, shaggy hairstyles influenced by mod and surfer fashion became popular along young men in Britain. The trend was connected to the growing popularity of indie and garage rock bands such as The Strokes, Jet, The Killers, The Hives, The Vines, Coldplay, and The White Stripes. These styles gradually replaced some of the longer, curtain-like hairstyles that had been popular among American celebrities during the late 1990s.

By the late 2000s, many young British men adopted shorter, neatly styles haircuts inspired by the 1950s. These styles were often maintained with pomade. Shaved heads, bald hairstyles, beards, moustache, stubble, sideburns, and goatees also became more common in Europe and North America. These trends developed alongside a shift away from the clean-shaven appearance.

==== Children and teenagers ====
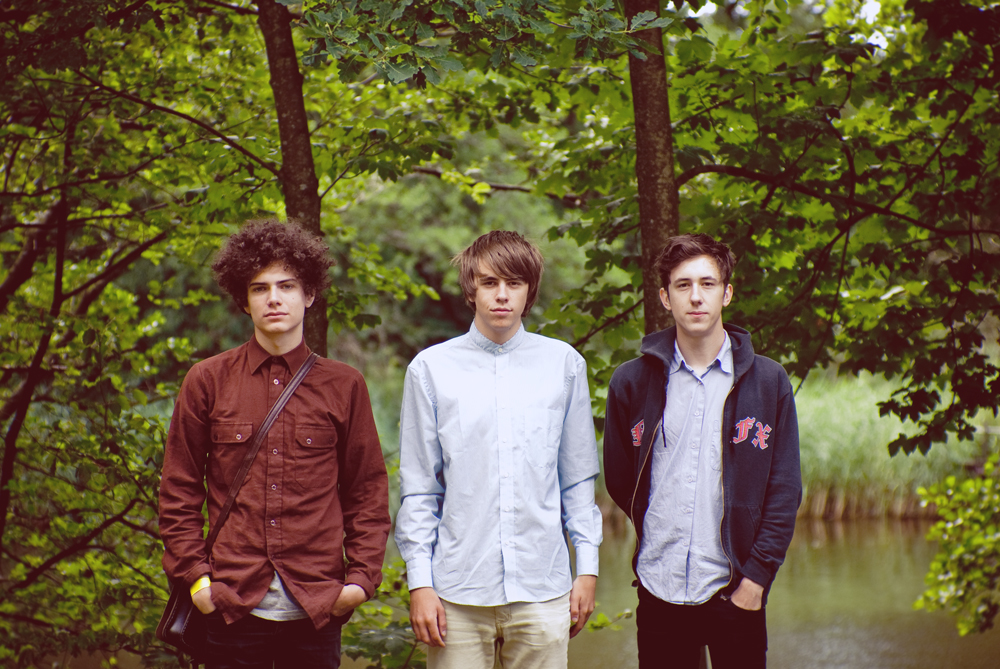
Swedish teenagers wearing typical late 2000s male hairstyles, 2008

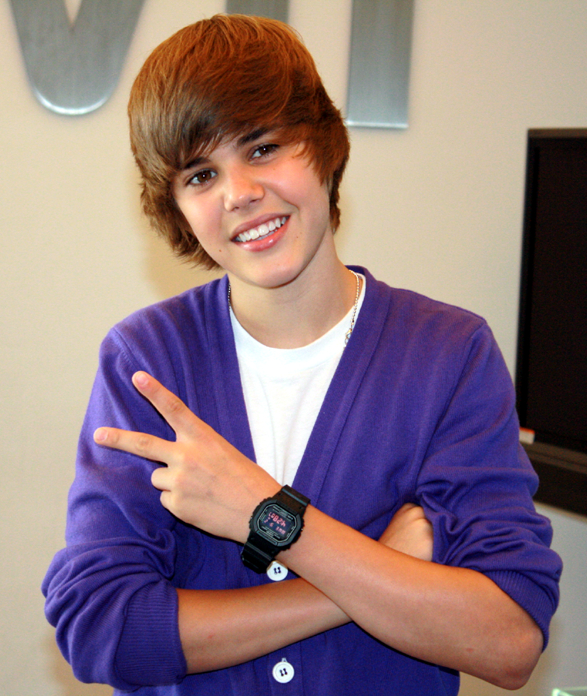
Wings haircut worn by singer Justin Bieber in 2009.

Short hairstyle were popular among boys. Common cuts included the quiff, buzzcut, curtain hairstyle, crew cut, and Caesar cut. Girls often wore straight hair extensions and chunky highlights. Around 2002 to 2005, curly hairstyles with zigzag side partings and blended highlights were also popular. Butterfly hair clips and crimped hairstyles remained common among preteen and teenage girls from the 1990s into the early 2000s.

During the middle of the decade, longer hairstyles became more popular among teenage boys. One recognizable style was the wings haircut, which was influenced by 1960s mod fashion and British indie pop musicicans. Hairstyles among teenage girls changed less noticeably during this period. Straight hair, highlights, extensions, ponytails, and long bangs remained common, while curly hairstyles became less popular.

In 2009, scene hairstyles influenced by Japanese Harajuku fashion became popular among some teenagers in Japan, United States, and Europe. These styles often featured brightly dyed hair, dramatic layers, and eyeliner and were worn by both girls and boys. Some teenage girls in the United States and Australasia instead favored preppy hairstyles with long, straight hair, side-swept bangs, and side parts. Boys often wore simpler hairstyles influenced by skate culture. Popular accessories included headbands, headwraps and 1980s inspired scrunchies. Hair was sometimes worn in side ponytails or French braids over one shoulder.

=== Makeup and cosmetic trends ===
Makeup in 2000 continued the glittery, futuristic styles associated with the 1990s and Y2K fashion. Metallic bronze tones, shimmering products, and bright colors were used to create a space-age appearance. Some people preferred purple and brown color palettes instead.

By the spring and summer of 2001, lower-maintenance makeup became more popular, with an emphasis on a natural appearance. However, glitter-based makeup continued to be worn. In 2002, mineral makeup entered mainstream popularity through produces such as Bare Minerals from Bare Escentuals. This contributed to the trend toward natural-looking makeup, which remained influential throughout much of the decade. By 2004, the glitter-heavy styles associated with the beginning of the decade had become less common.

Around 2005 and 2006, makeup inspired by the 1940s returned to popularity. This included bright red lipstick and cat-eye eyeliner. Lip gloss remained popular, while smokey eye makeup became more common, emphasizing eyeliner, mascara, and eyeshadow. A more natural apporach to makeup also gained attention during this period.

In the second half of the decade, complexion products such as illuminators and shimmer-based cosmetics became increasingly popular. False eyelashes also became more visible in mainstream beauty trends, with Lady Gaga among the celebrities associated with the look. This contributed to greater interest in eyelash tinting, extensions, and false lashes. Makeup styles increasingly emphasized individual preferences, while online makeup tutorials, including videos on YouTube, provided new ways for people to learn application techniques.

=== Tattoos and piercings ===
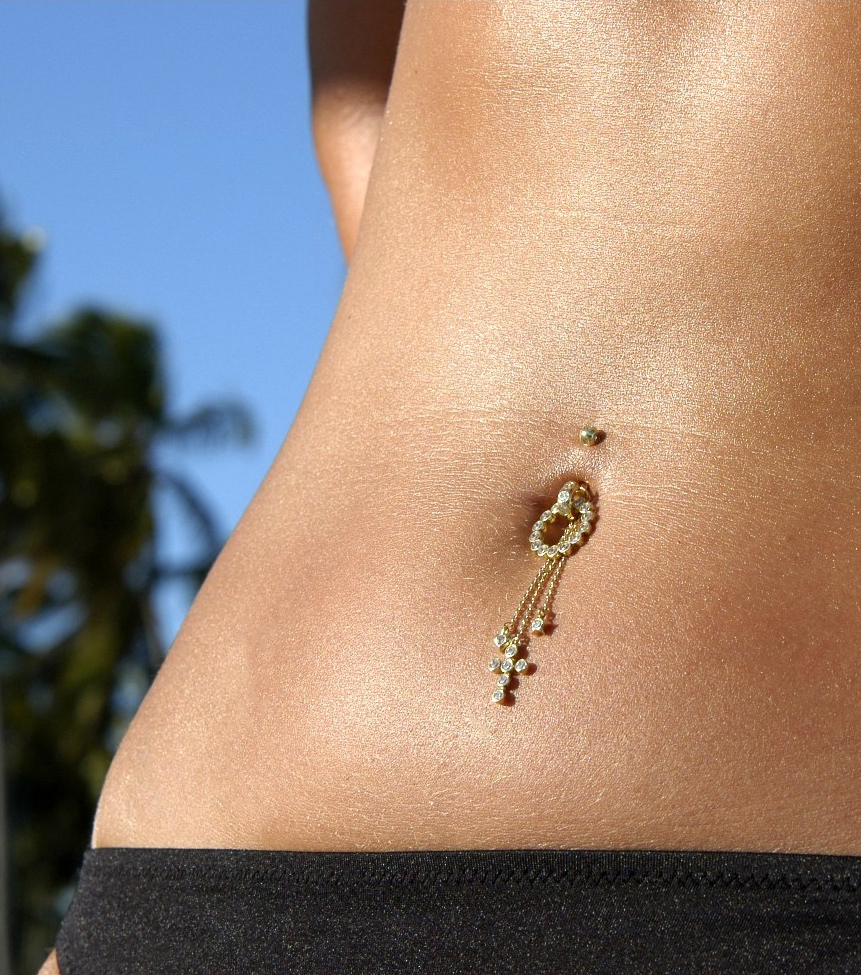
Navel piercings were popular from 1995 all the way to 2007/2008.

Tattoos and piercings remained popular among people of different genders during the 2000s, continuing trends that had developed during the 1990s. Common tattoo styles in Europe, Australasia, Hong Kong, and North America included lower-back tattoos, often. referred to as "tramp stamps", and tribal designs on the arms.

Traditional tattoos designs depicting hearts, skulls, flowers or female figures were sometimes viewed as outdated or unfashionable during much of the decade, particularly among women. These designs experienced renewed interest around 2008 alongside the popularity of Ed Hardy accessories and pin-up inspired fashion. Another novelty trend was the "fingerstache", a small mustache tattoo placed on a finger and positioned near the upper lip to create the appearance of a mustache. The trend emerged around 2003.

Navel piercings and tongue rings were especially popular during the early 2000s. Other common piercings included labret, nostril, and eyebrow piercings. Tattoos and piercings remained visible throughout the middle and later years of the decade and contributed to be popular in the 2010s.

Gallery

A selection of images related to the period.

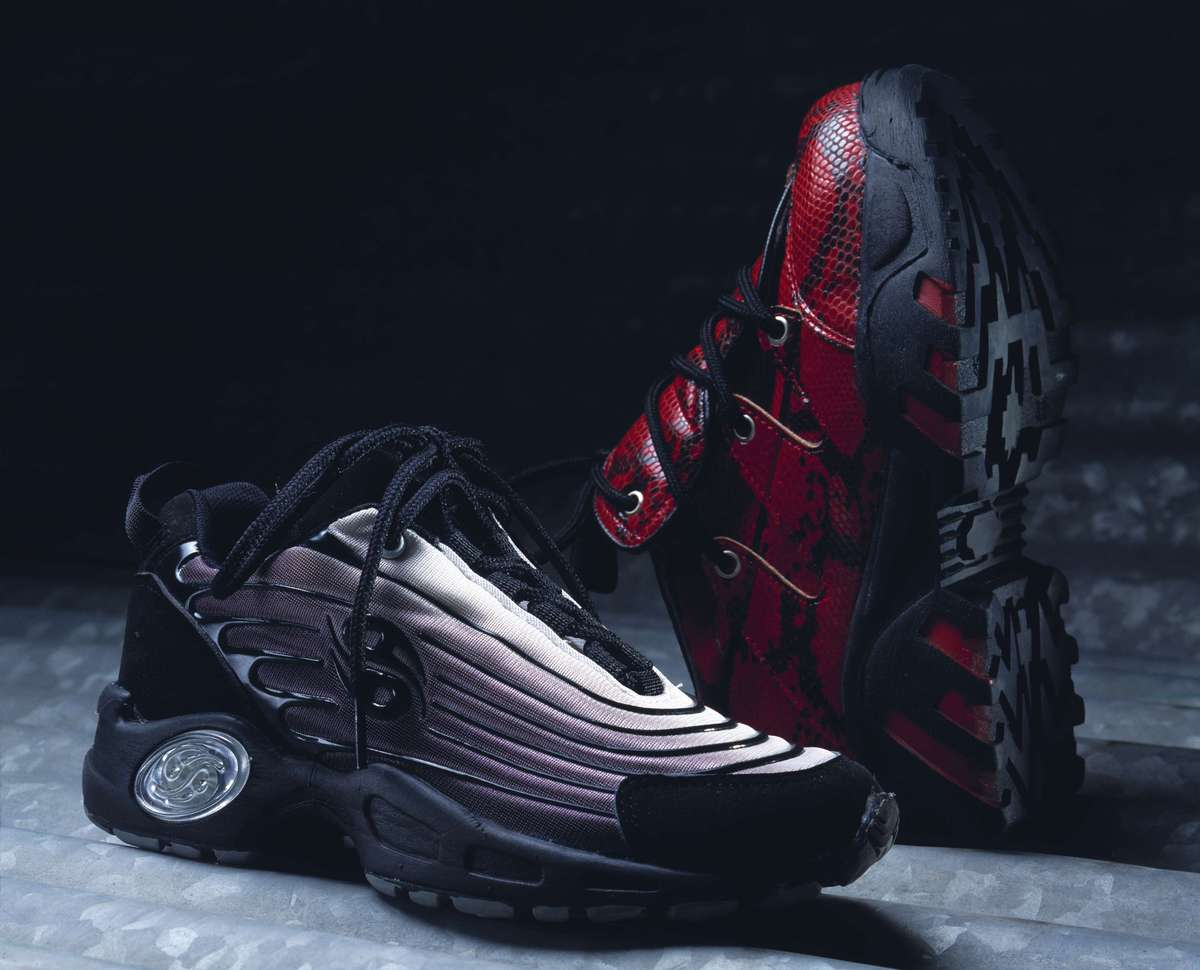
Chunky sneakers of the early 2000s.

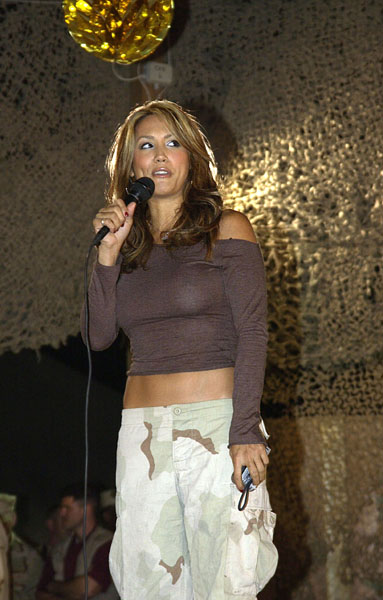
Leeann Tweeden, 2003, wearing an off-the-shoulder top and cargo pants. She also sports highlights on her hair.

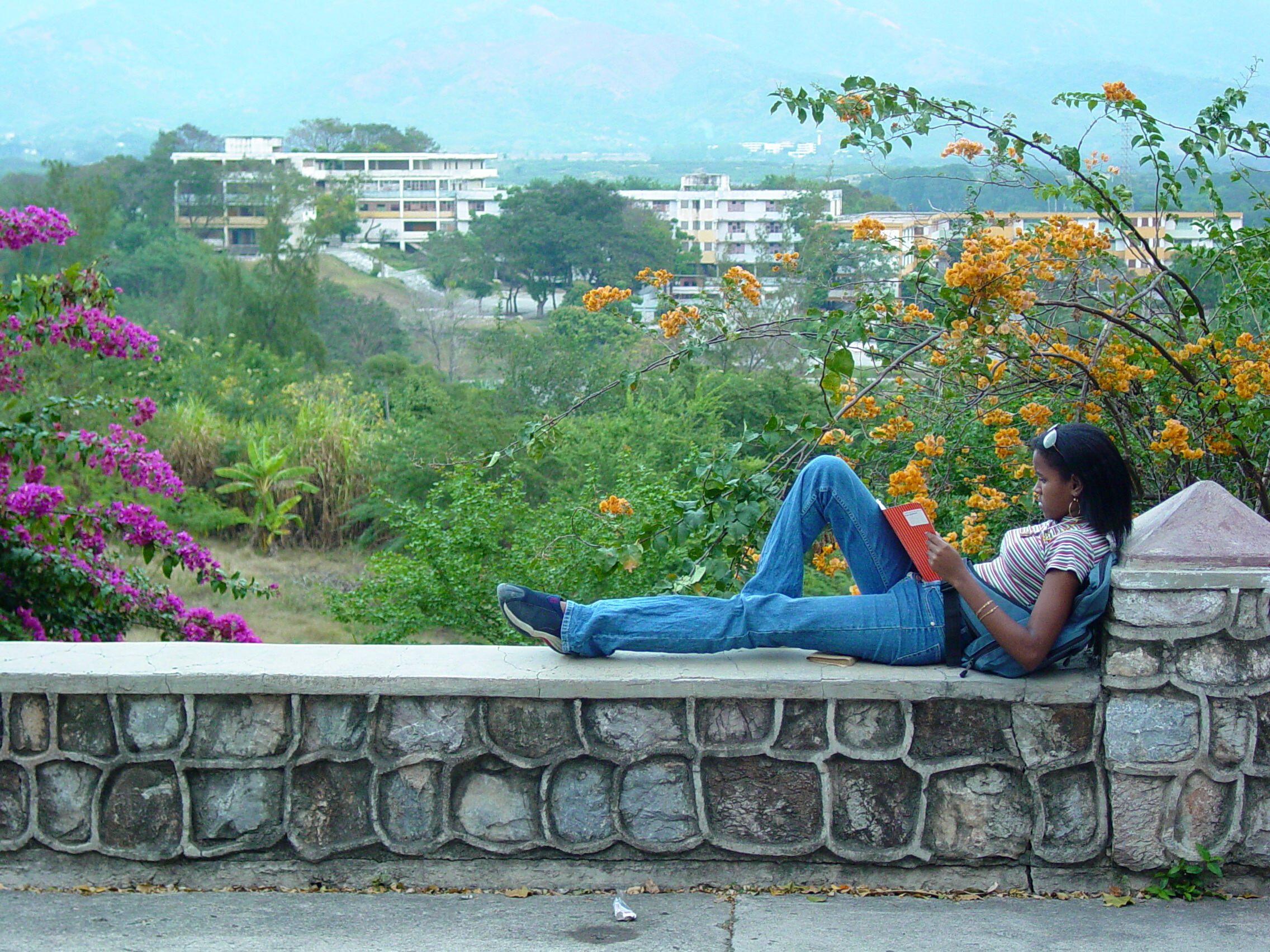
Young woman in 2003 wearing a horizontal striped shirt and boot-cut jeans.

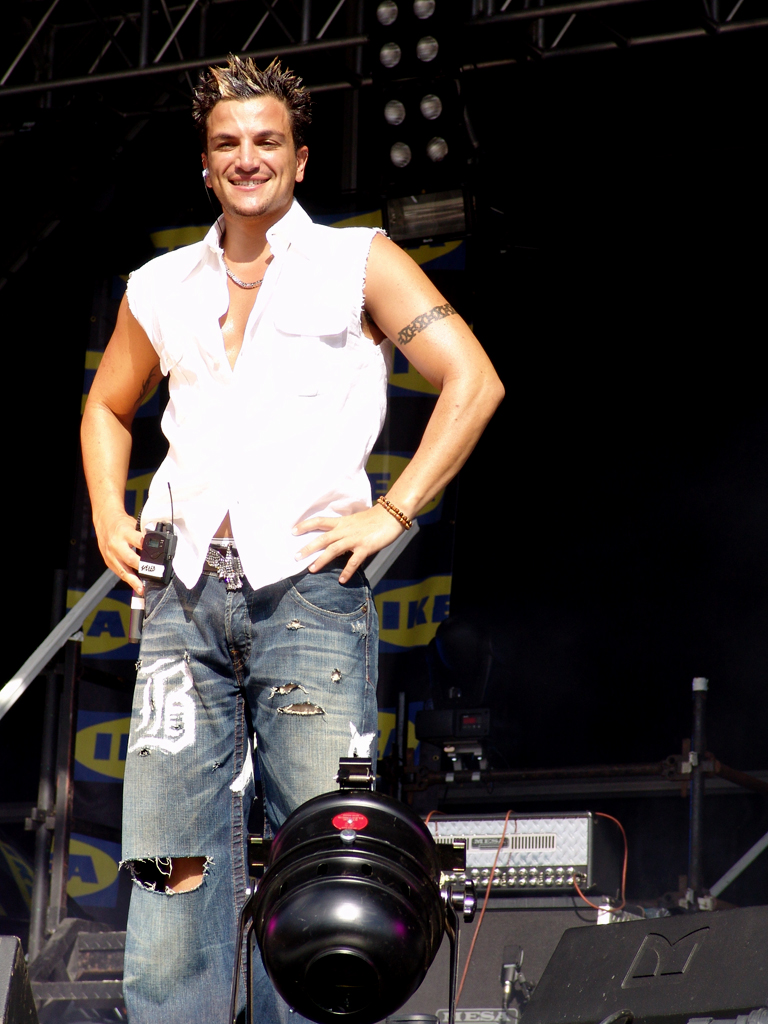
English-Australian singer Peter Andre in 2004 wearing ripped and sandblasted baggy jeans influenced by surfer and hip-hop fashion.

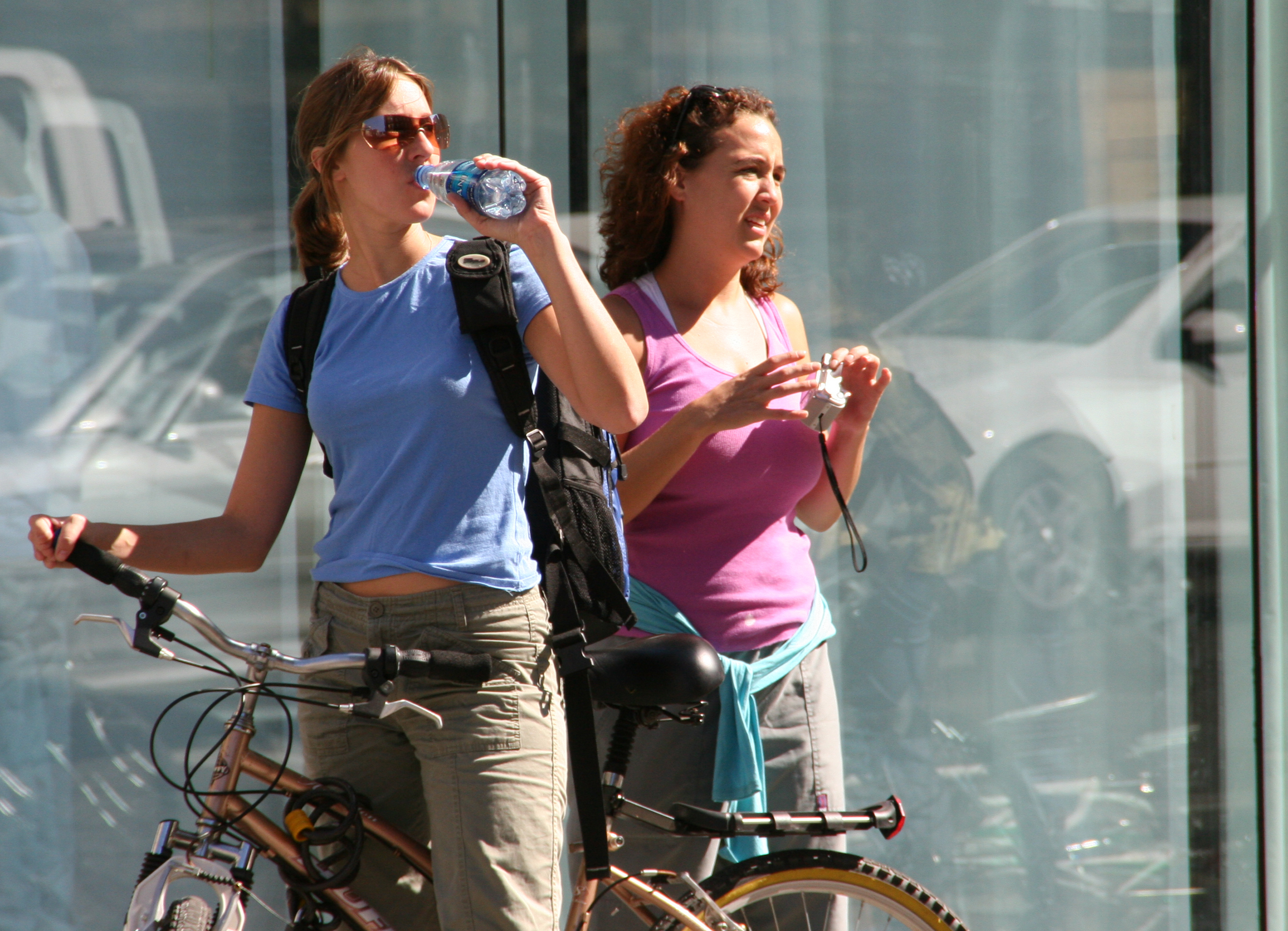
Female tourists in 2005 sporting colorful mid-2000s athletic fashions.

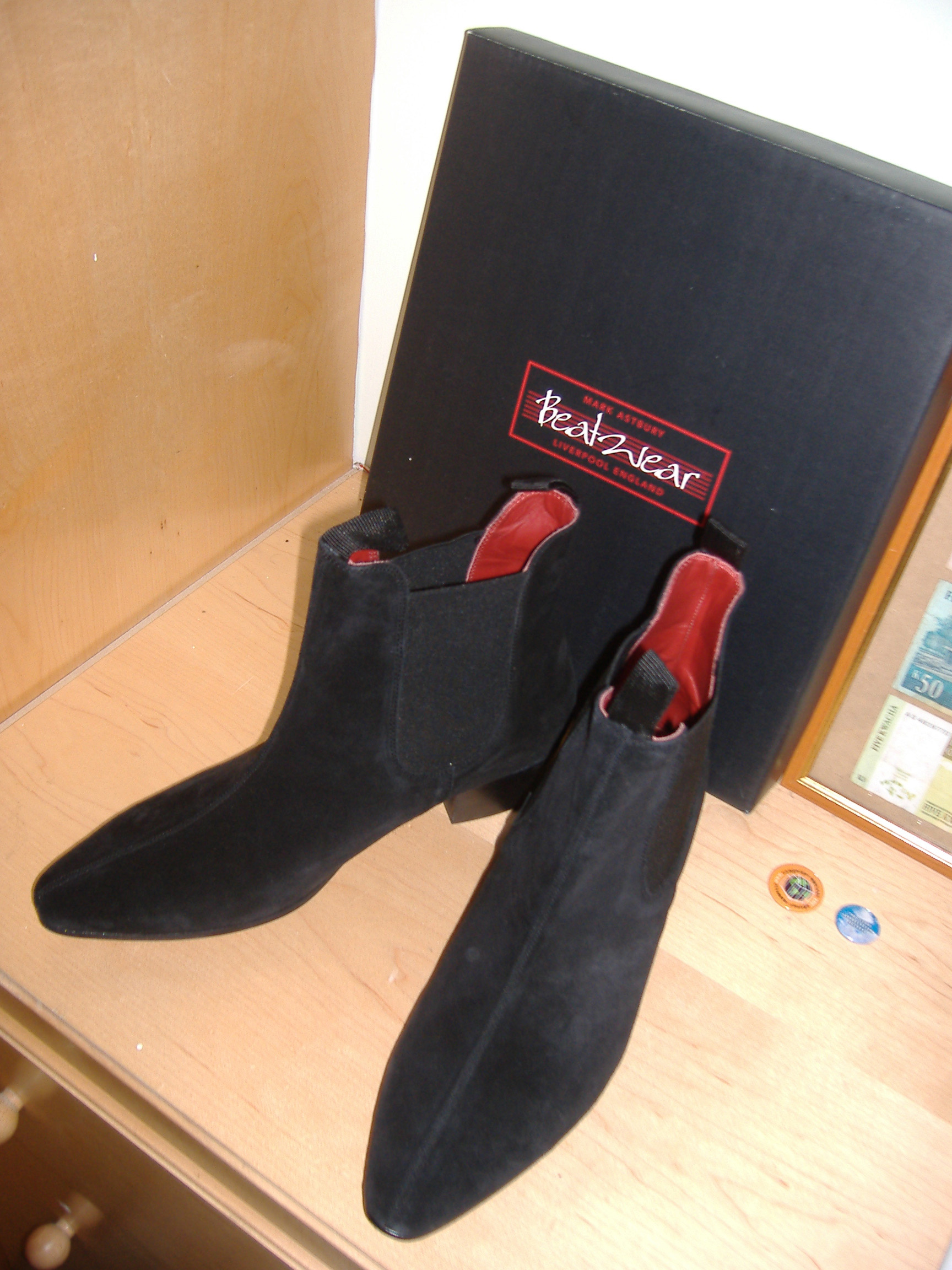
Winklepicker boots fashionable in England, Italy and Mexico from 2005 onwards.

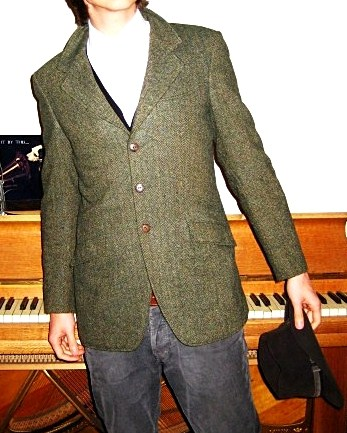
Slim-fit tweed popular in the late 2000s

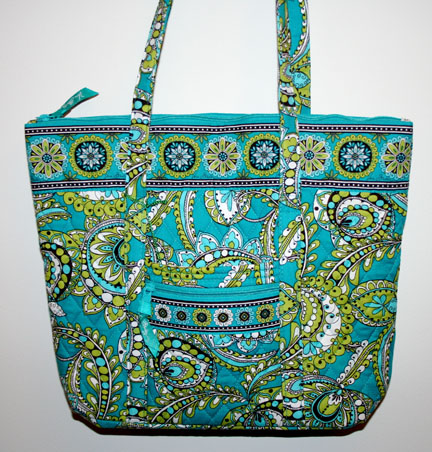
Paisley handbag associated with the boho-chic look.

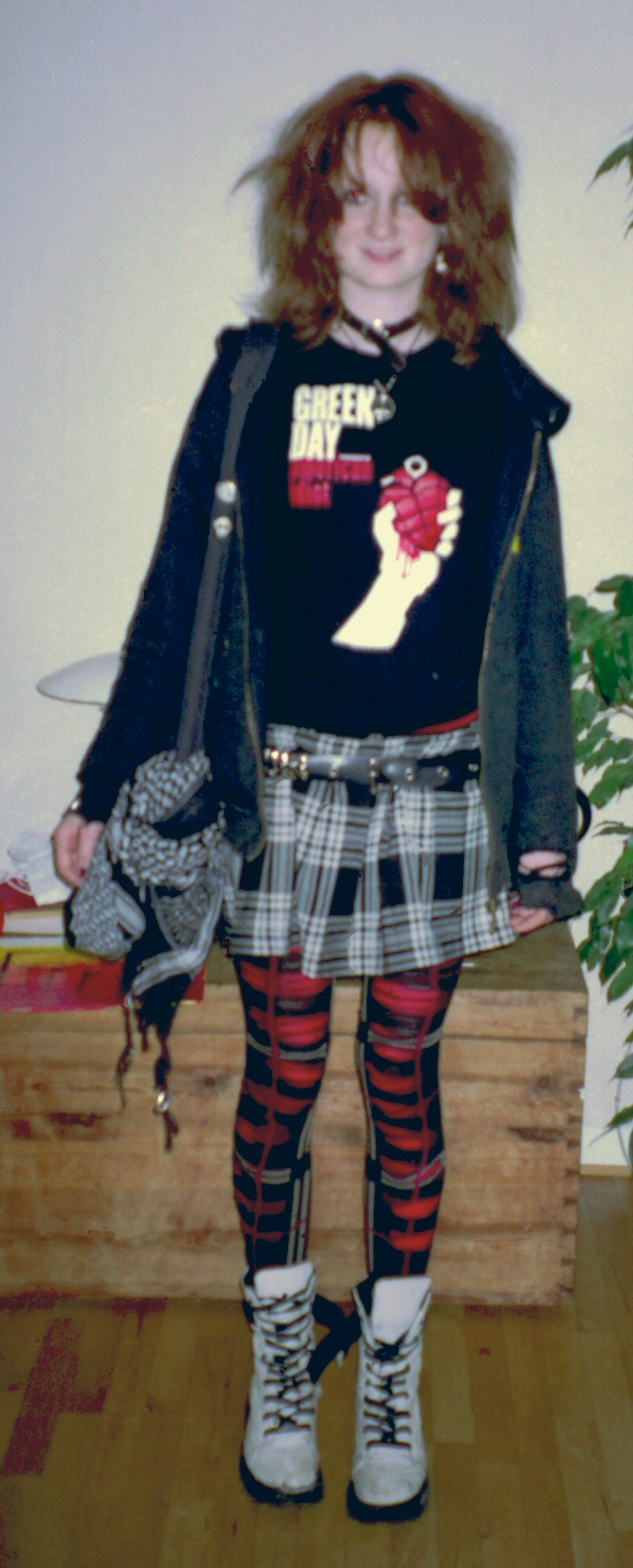
German Mosher, the more punk-like incarnation of scene, early to mid-2000s.

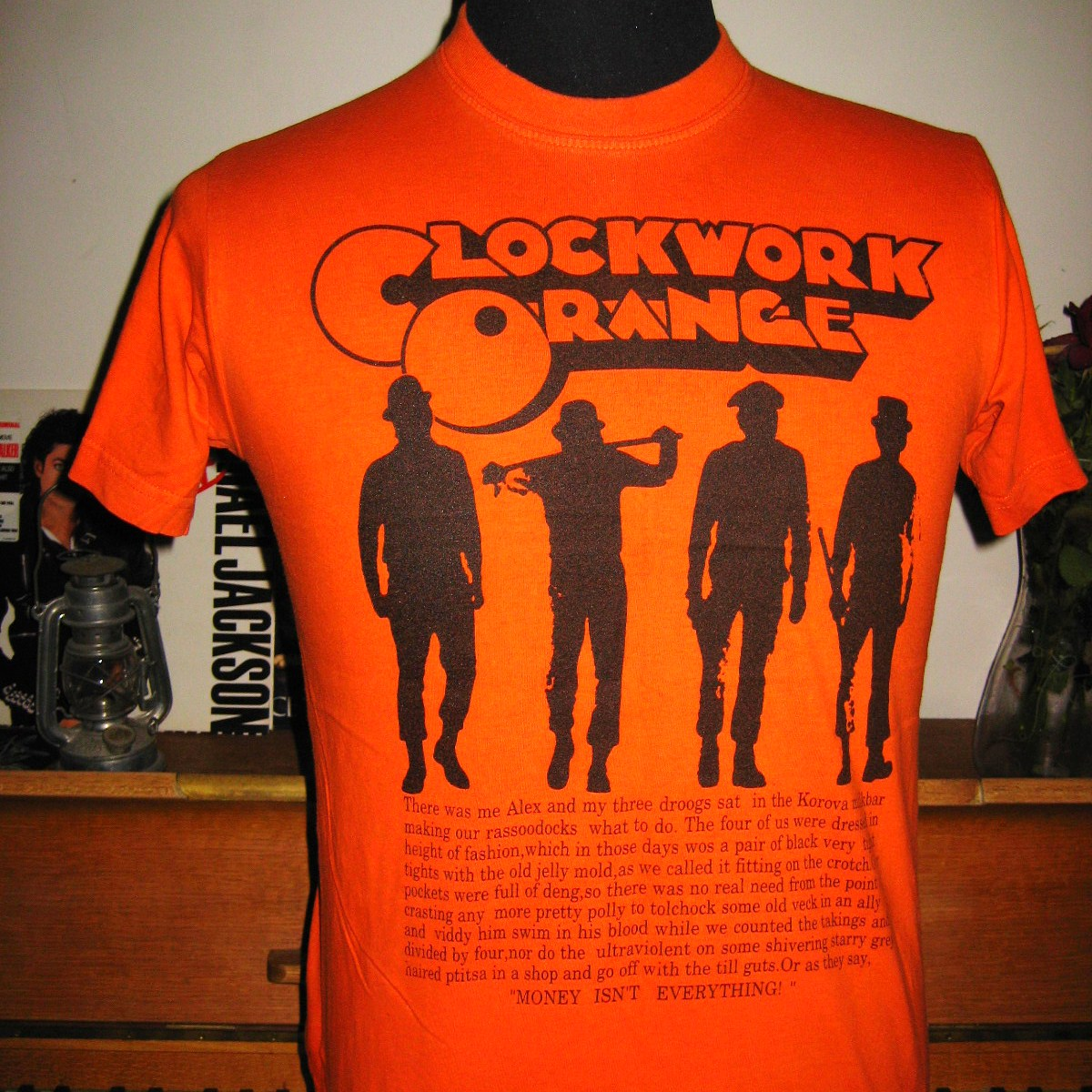
Close-fitting vintage printed T-shirt

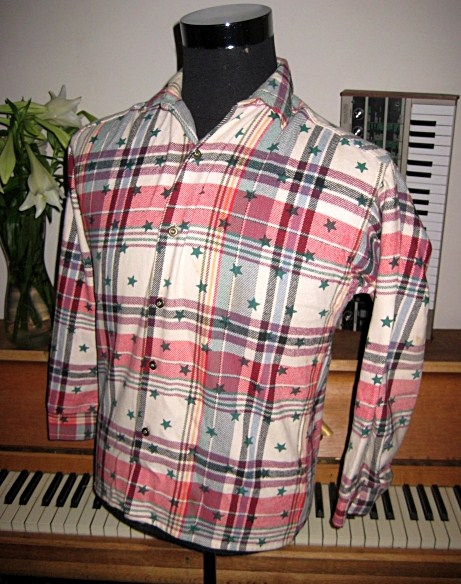
Slim-fitting plaid Western shirt gained popularity in the UK in the late 2000s

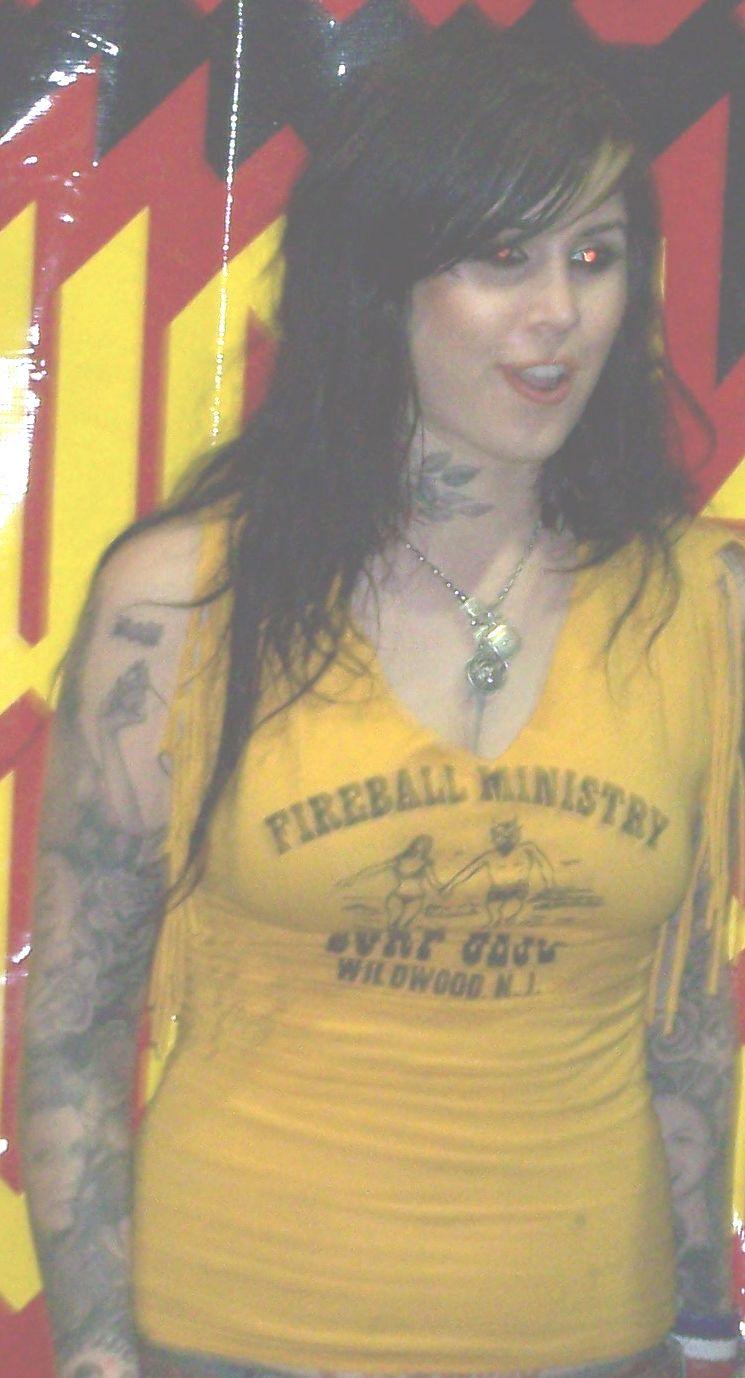
Tattoos and extreme body piercings went mainstream in the late 2000s.

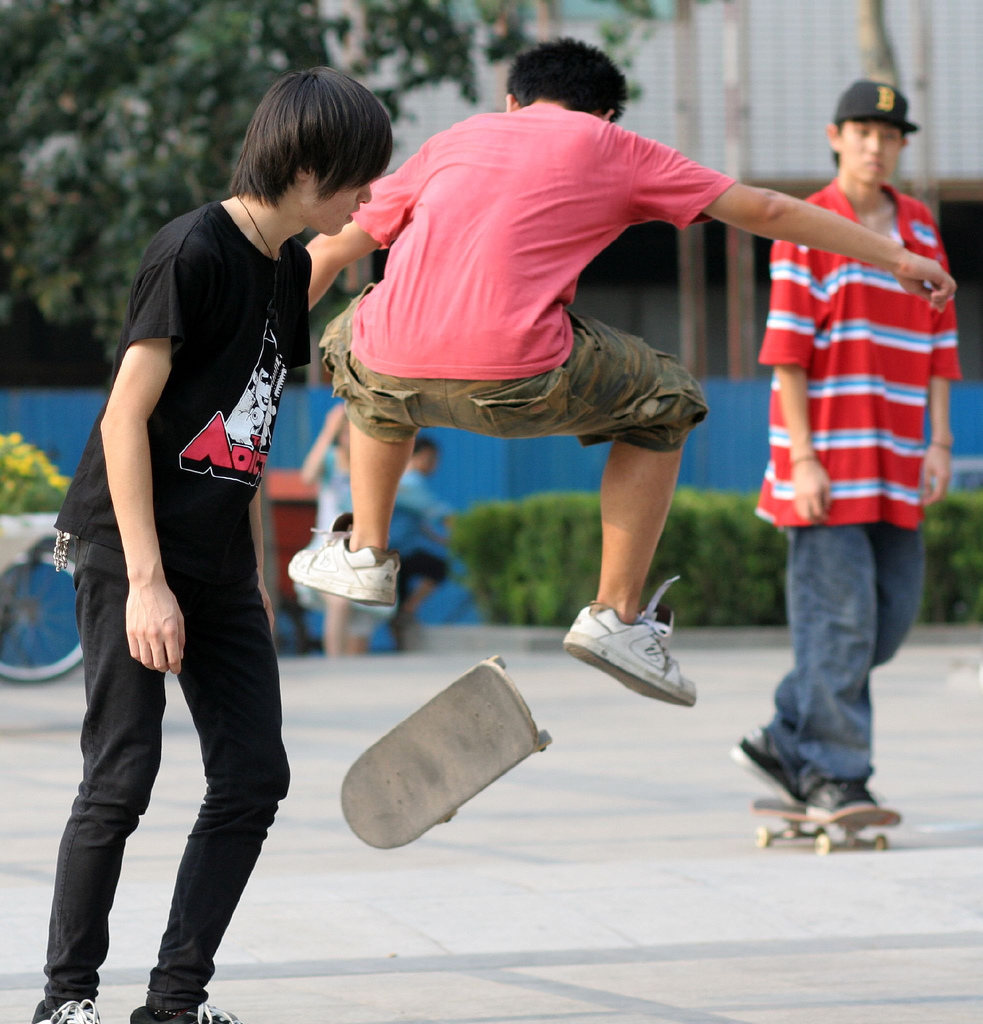
Chinese skaters, 2007.

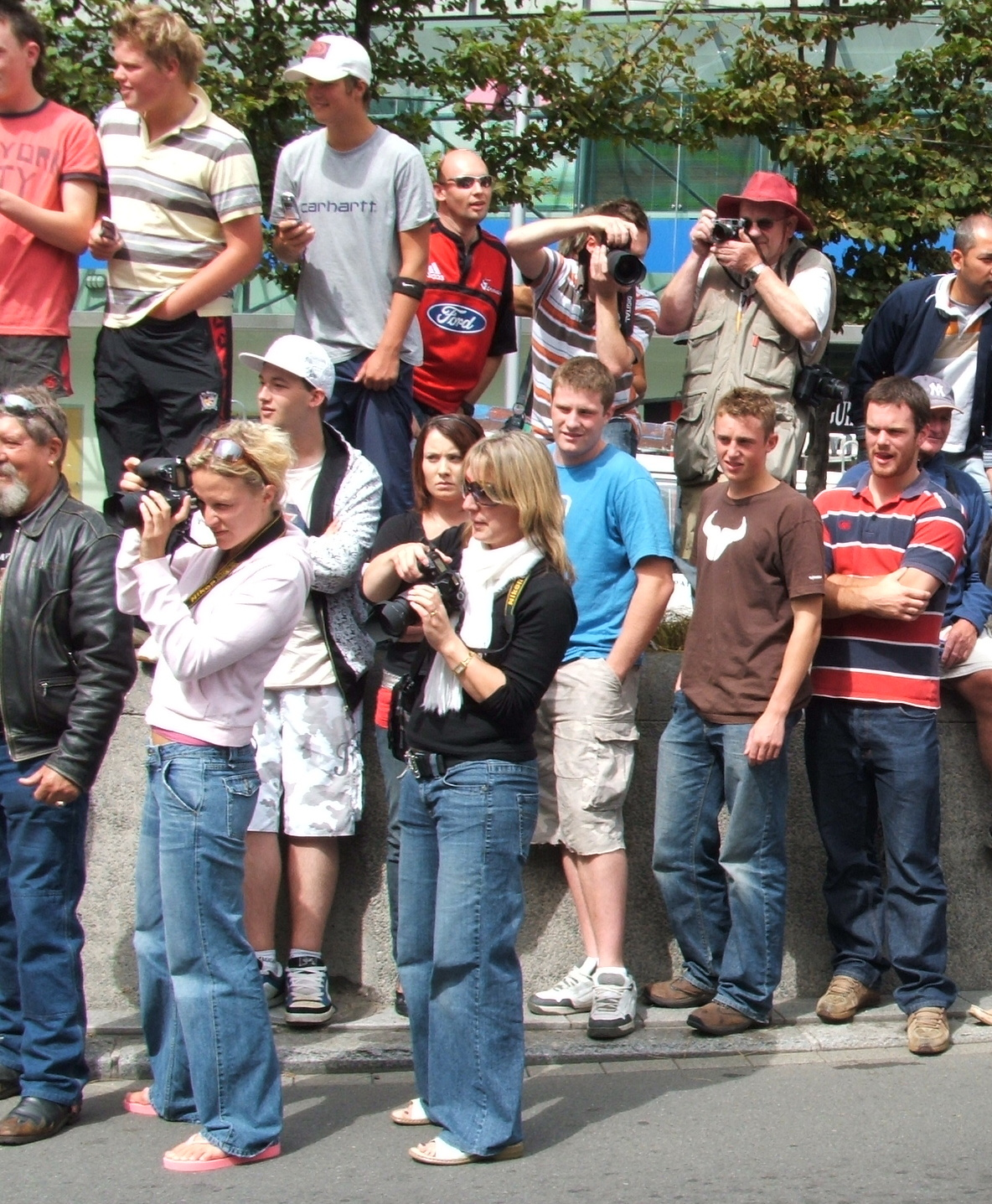
People wearing loose jeans in New Zealand, 2007.

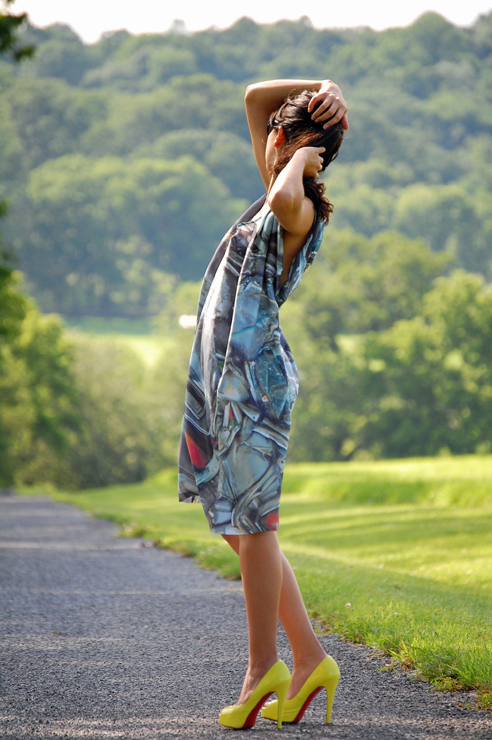
Young woman wearing sundress and Christian Louboutin shoes, 2009.

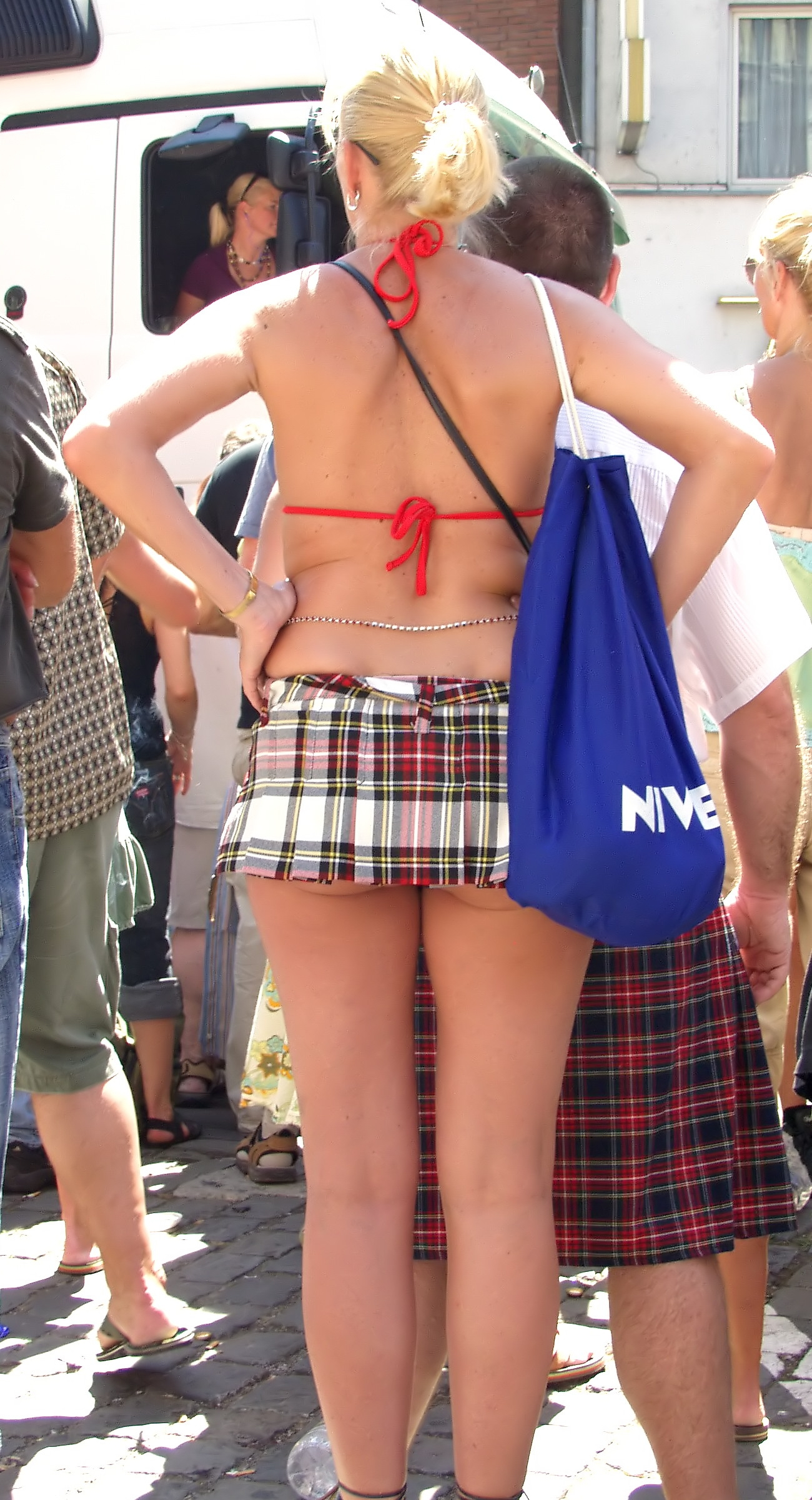
Woman wearing backless top and microskirt at Cologne Pride, 2006.
