= Asics GT-2160 =

Line of running shoes by Asics

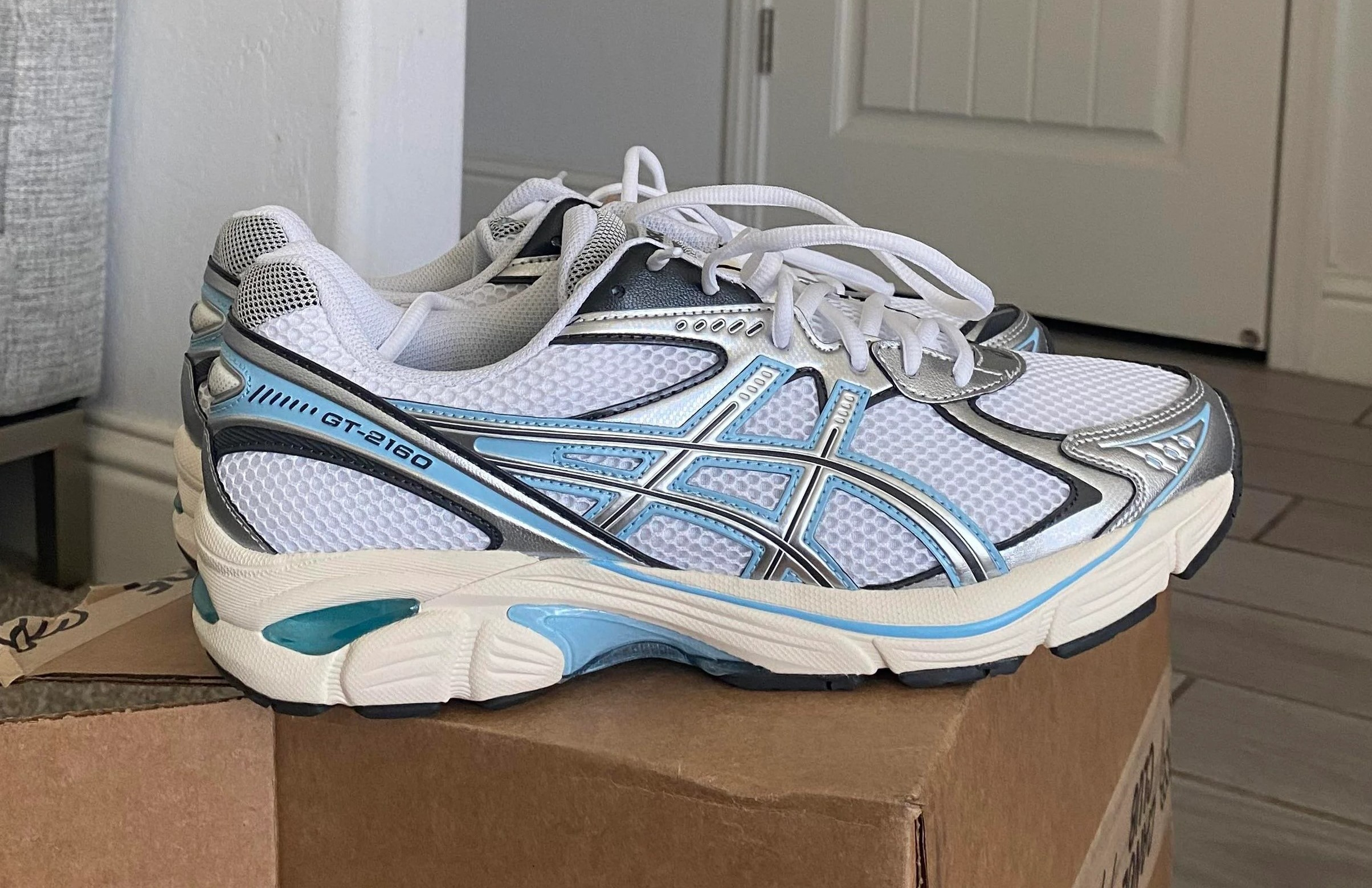
- Type: Sneakers
- Inventor: Asics
- Inception: 2011; 15 years ago
- Available: Yes

Asics GT-2160 is a running shoe released by Asics. The shoe is part of the GT-2000 line of running shoes, a cheaper stability line that sits beneath the Gel-Kayano series.

== Overview ==
The GT-2160 was released in spring 2011 as a refresh to the GT-2000 line. It was the update to the GT-2150, released in November 2009 in specialty stores with a wider release in January 2010. The shoe only lasted a couple of months on the market before being replaced in January 2012 by the GT-2170.

Updates to the shoe featured a softer lining inside for better comfort. The shoe features softened Gel and foam in the midsole for a softer feel and added deep grooves in the outsole. The shoe was the lightest model up to that point and also lighter than the current Gel-Kayano model at that time. Stability in the shoe is provided by two units of Asics Gel that are found in the heel and forefoot and the DuoMax system, which is a hard piece of foam found in the mold of the midsole. The main addition to the GT-2160 was the Guidance Line, a longitudinal groove carved into the midsole that guides the foot through the most efficient stride while also reducing weight.

The shoe was brought back in July 2023 after the popularity of 2000s running shoes in the early 2020s. The release was first introduced with Montreal based fashion brand, Dime, and then followed with a general release.
