= Trucker hat =

Hat style popular with American workers

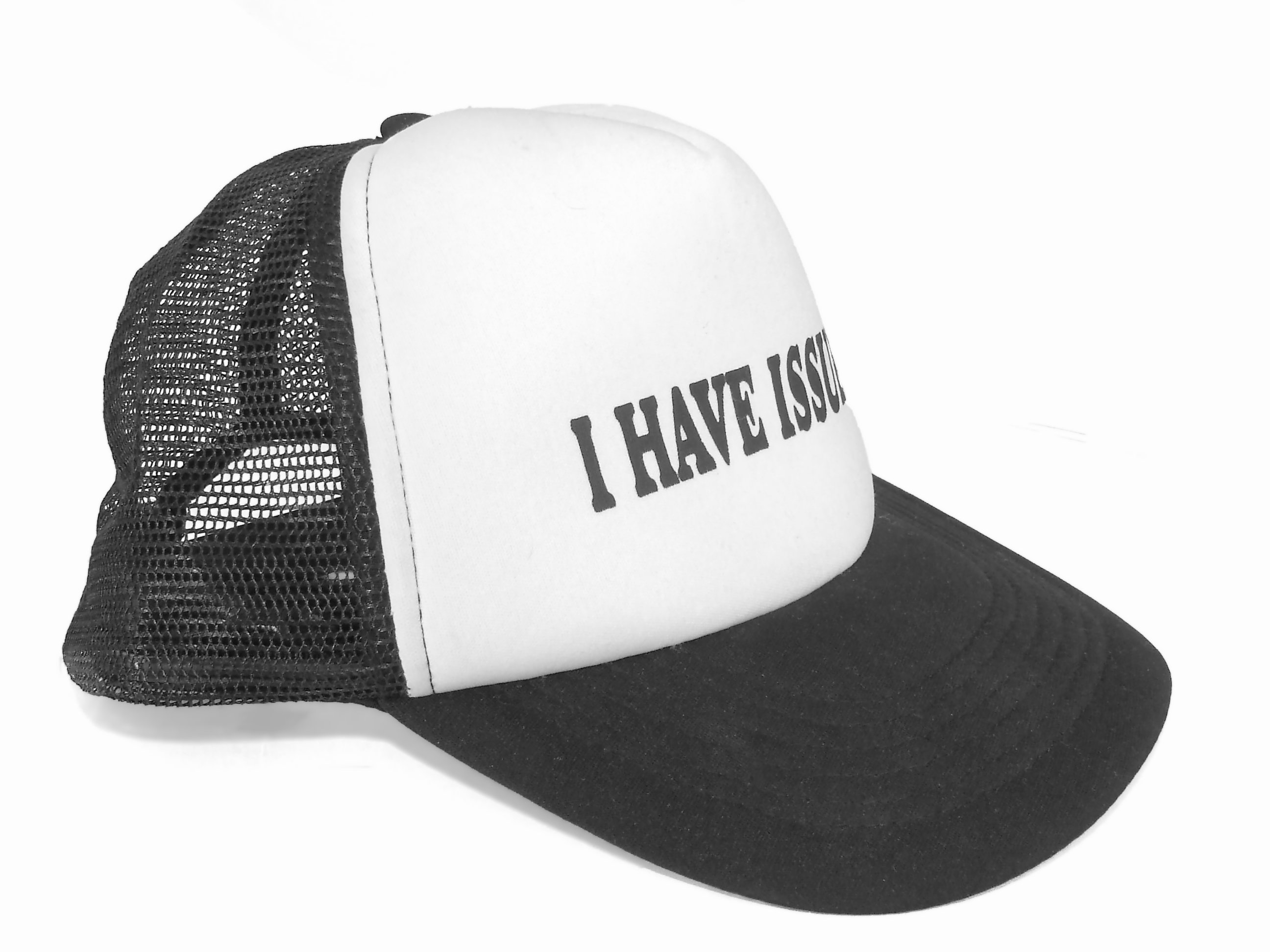
A trucker hat that says "I have issues"

A trucker hat, mesh cap or netback cap is a soft hat with a rounded crown and a stiff flat bill projecting in front. It is also sometimes known as a "gimme [as in 'give me'] cap" or a "feed cap" because this style of hat originated during the 1970s as a promotional give-away from U.S. feed or farming supply companies to farmers, truck drivers, or other rural workers.

== Description ==
The design of a trucker cap is similar to that of a baseball cap, with a slightly curved bill in front, a cap constructed from six almost triangular gores, and a button on top. Instead of being made of cotton fabric like a typical baseball cap, the front section of a trucker hat above the bill is foam, and the rest is plastic mesh for breathability. The foam front of the hat stands up straight and stiff, which makes the trucker hat taller than most baseball caps. There is an adjustable plastic snap or hook-and-loop closure in the back to ensure that one size fits most. This design was intended to make the cap much cooler in the sun or hot weather for the comfort of the wearer.

== 21st century trend ==
In the early 2000s, the trucker hat became a mainstream fashion trend, predominantly among suburban American youth associated with the hip-hop, pop punk, and skater subcultures. This came about with a sense of irony due to the hat's rural or blue collar association and typically older demographic. It has frequently been donned by celebrities; musician Pharrell Williams and actor Ashton Kutcher in particular helped make the hat fashionable. However, in a 2008 interview with Fashion Rocks magazine, singer Justin Timberlake claimed that, while Kutcher has been cited for popularizing the trucker hat, Timberlake had been wearing them since the age of seventeen. The trucker hat trend was lampooned in the King of the Hill episode "Grand Theft Arlen", in which teenagers confuse Hank Hill by asking where he bought his Strickland Propane cap and questioning its irony.

Comedian Judah Friedlander is known for his signature trucker hats, which bear various humorous phrases. Having worn trucker hats since the 1980s, Friedlander claims a fondness for them and has ignored any rejection or embracing of them as fashion trends throughout the decades. In a 2007 interview, he said he had been making and wearing trucker hats since the 1980s. People made fun of him for wearing them, only to ask where he got them when they became trendy ten years later. Some accused him of being racist since the hat made him look like a redneck.

== See also ==
- Mechanic's cap, worn by truckers from the 1930s until the 1960s
- List of hat styles
- 2000s in fashion
- Baseball cap – Type of soft, billed hat
- Patrol cap – Soft cap worn by military personnel in the field
- Workwear – Clothing worn for a profession
