= Chino cloth =

Cotton twill cloth

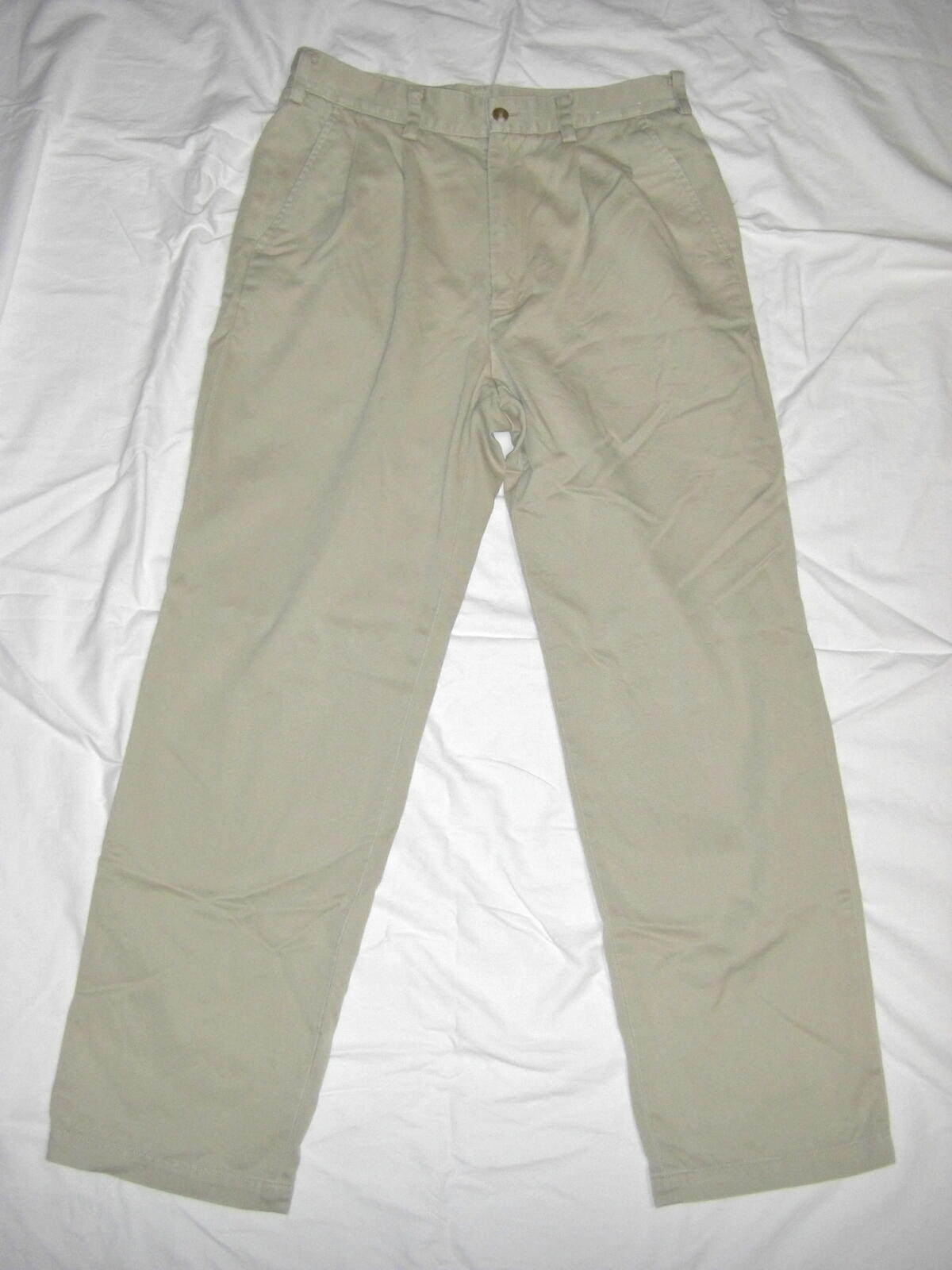
A pair of trousers made from chino cloth, generally referred to as chinos

Chino cloth (/ˈtʃiːnoʊ/ CHEE-noh) is a twill fabric originally made from pure cotton. The most common items made from it, trousers, are widely called chinos. Today it is also found in cotton-synthetic blends.

Developed in the mid-19th century for British military uniforms, it has since migrated into civilian wear. Trousers of such a fabric gained popularity in the U.S. when Spanish–American War veterans returned from the Philippines with their twill military trousers.

== Etymology ==
It is unknown why American veterans called the trousers "chinos". It is theorized that the cloth or the trousers were made in China.

The American Heritage Dictionary says that the word is from American Spanish chino, literally "toasted", in reference to its usual color. But this is not a usual meaning of the Spanish word.

For other possible origins see also the references to chinos in Manila galleon.

== History ==
First designed to be used in the military, chino fabric was originally made to be simple, durable and comfortable for soldiers to wear and based on the khaki found in India; the use of natural earth-tone colors also began the move towards camouflage, instead of the brightly colored Tunics used prior. The British Army and the United States Army started wearing it as standard during the latter half of the 19th century.

The all-cotton fabric is widely used for trousers, referred to as chinos. The original khaki (light brown) is the traditional and most popular color, but chinos are made in many shades.
