= Bouffant gown =

Dress style with a very full skirt

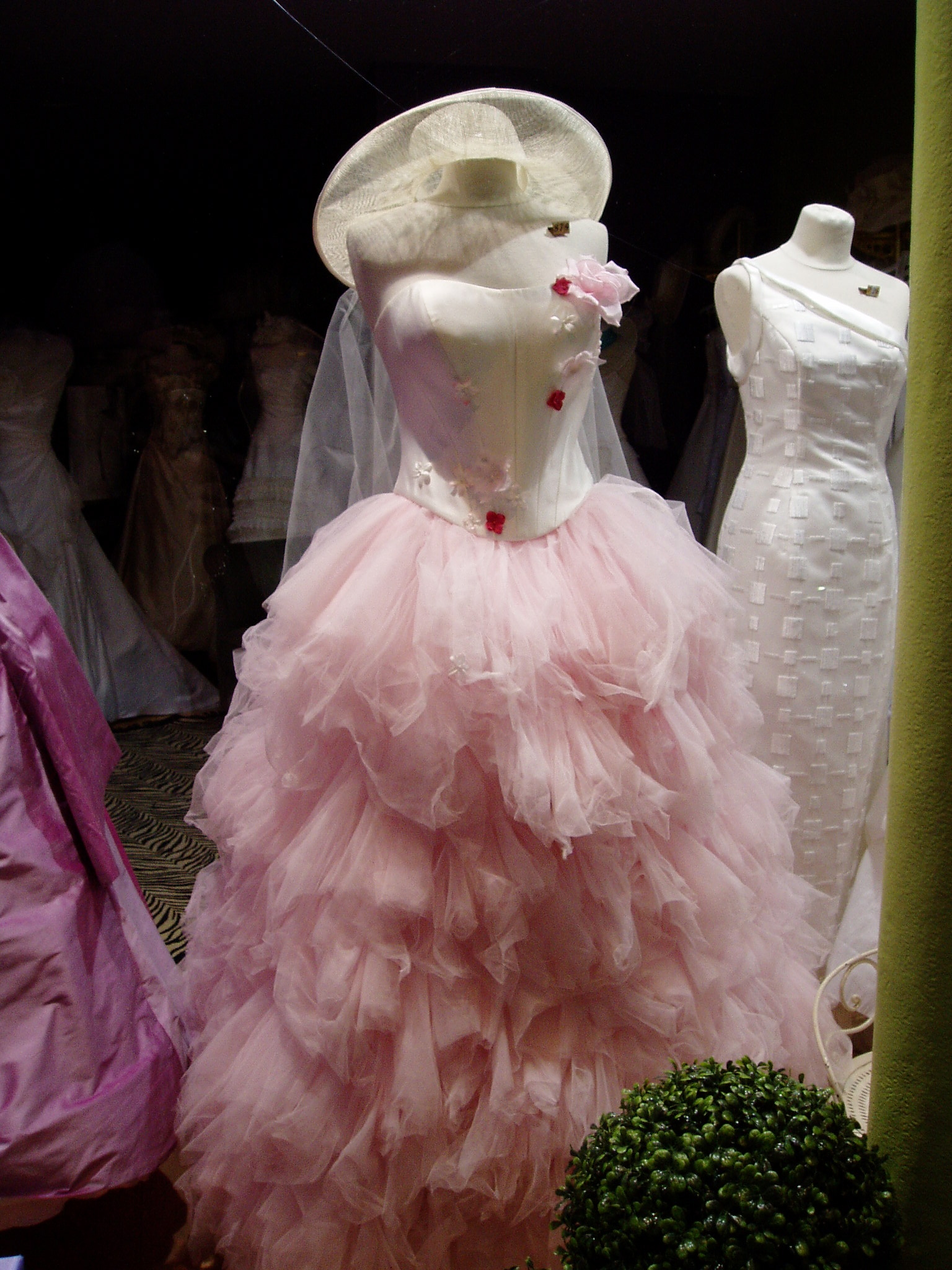
A Parisian bouffant gown made of pink tulle.

A bouffant gown is a women's dress silhouette made of a wide, full skirt resembling a hoop skirt (and sometimes including a hoop or petticoat support underneath the skirt). It may be tea length (mid-calf length) or floor length.

== History ==
Bouffant gowns were a popular silhouette during the mid-19th century. It fell out of style by the end of the 19th century, but re-emerged in the 1930s, to appear in evening gowns during the 1930s and 1940s. It was fully revived in tea-length designs in 1947 by Christian Dior's New Look couture collection. The style remained very popular at calf or ankle length throughout the 1950s.

== Popularity ==
Bouffant gowns fell out of fashion during the 1960s and 1970s, as streamlined skirts became associated with modern trends. The resurgence of Victorian styles during the 1980s, as in the wedding dress of Lady Diana Spencer in 1981, brought the bouffant gown back into style. Today, it is mainly seen in wedding gowns, Quinceañera gowns, or ball gowns.
