= Chunky sandals =

Style of open-toe footwear

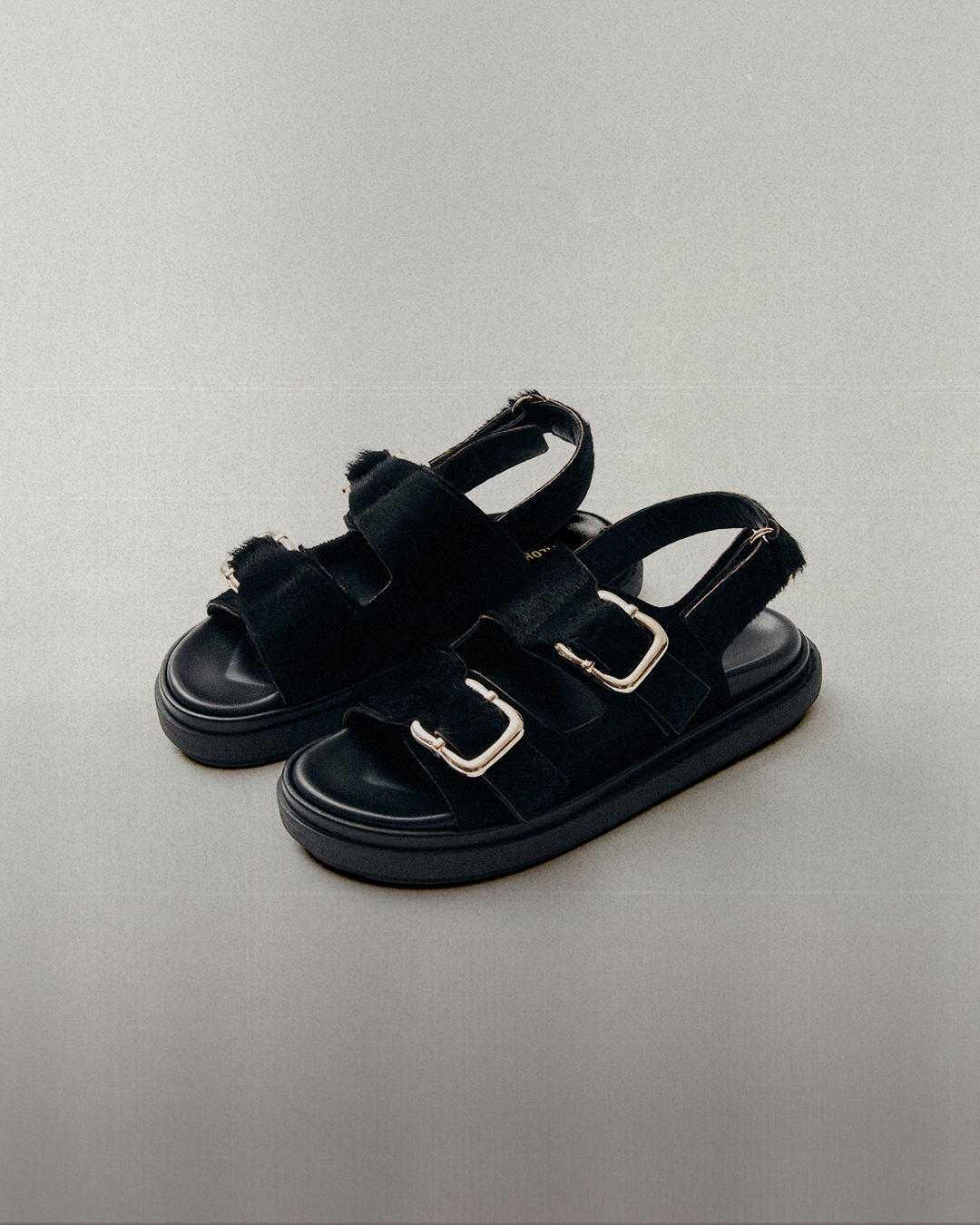
A pair of chunky sandals

Chunky sandals are popular, often minimalistic styles of open-toe footwear. Chunky sandals feature thicker, more robust soles, often with platforms or exaggerated treads. Built with thick soles and durable straps, sometimes adjustable straps often secured with hook-and-loop fasteners, they give support and stability on uneven terrains.

== History ==
Chunky sandals are influenced by alternative fashion styles. Brands like Dr. Martens and Buffalo became one of the first to produce chunky sandals, incorporating thick soles and rugged designs.

In the 2010s and 2020s, chunky sandals became popular again, being accompanied by the "ugly shoe" trend where unconventional and exaggerated footwear became fashionable.

== Design and materials ==
Chunky sandals feature wide straps, various design elements, thick soles, etc.

=== Types of Chunky sandals ===
- Platform Sandals: Elevated soles that add uniform height across the footbed.
- Sport Sandals: Designed for outdoor activities, with thick soles and adjustable straps; examples include Teva and Chacos sandals.
- Dad Sandals: Characterized by their bulky appearance, velcro straps, and emphasis on comfort; popularized in recent fashion trends.

== Chunky sandals ==
Brands like Balenciaga, Prada, and Gucci have included chunky sandals in their collections, pairing them with both casual and high-fashion ensembles. The sandals have been alsopopularized by celebrities and influencers.
