= Boudoir cap =

Form of lingerie nightcap

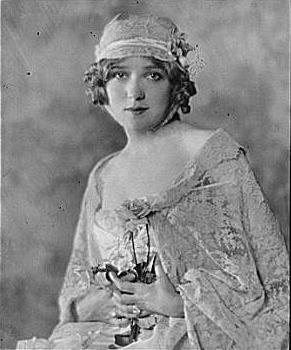
Mary Pickford wearing a boudoir cap and negligee in 1921

A boudoir cap is a form of lingerie nightcap that was popular in the 19th and early 20th centuries.

== Description ==
In its original form, the boudoir cap was worn over undressed hair, and has been compared to the 18th century mob cap. Particularly towards the end it was designed to be worn in the privacy of the boudoir with negligees or nightwear. It was often made from lightweight lingerie-type fabrics such as muslin, lace, crochet or net, and trimmed with silk ribbon and lace.

During its later revival in the 1910s and 1920s, it was used to protect short hairstyles whilst sleeping, or first thing in the morning as ideal "for the smart bedroom woman" to hide the morning hair mess. In London, during the WWI Zeppelin raids, women grew more self-conscious of their night attire as bombings often led Londoners to evacuate their houses in the middle of the night. Boudoir caps were a preferred choice to rapidly and stylishly cover their hair.

Towards the end of the 1920s and into the 1930s, the boudoir cap evolved into a form of decorative hairnet. The fashion of short hair for women contributed to the declining use of the boudoir cap.

== See also ==
- List of hat styles
- Nightcap
