= Babydoll =

Type of nightwear for women

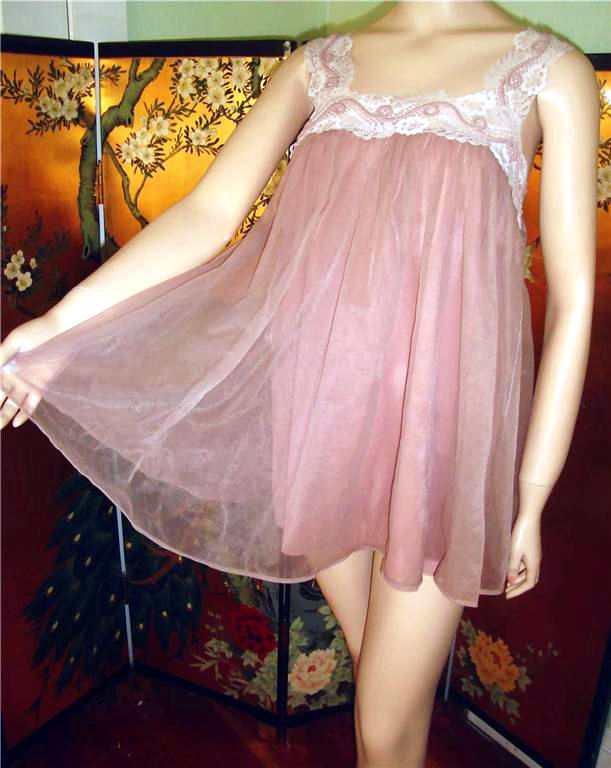
An older pink babydoll

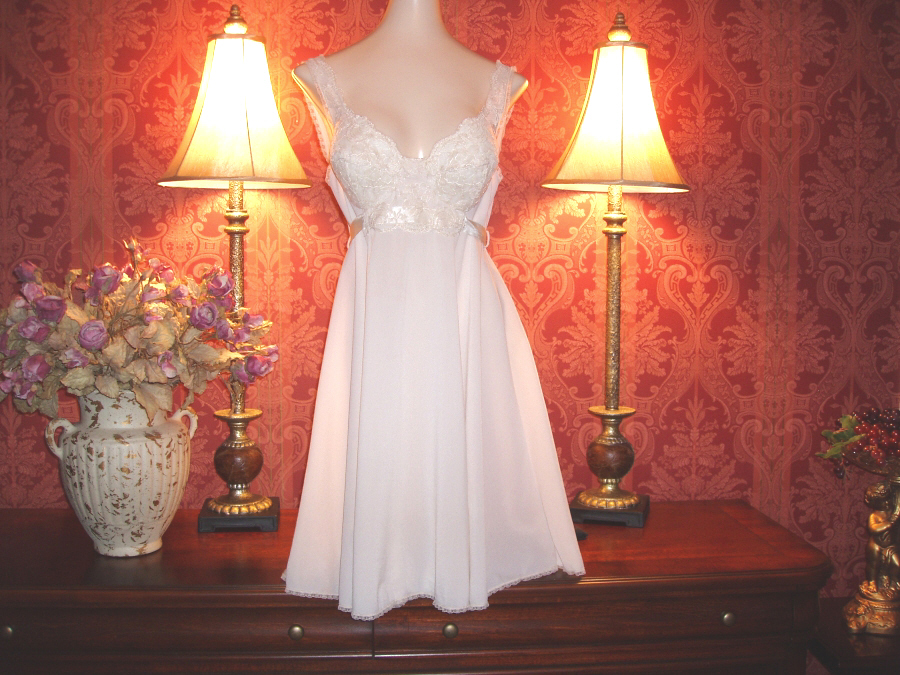
A more recent babydoll

A babydoll is a short, sleeveless, loose-fitting nightgown or negligee, intended as nightwear for women. It sometimes has formed cups called a bralette for cleavage with an attached, loose-fitting skirt falling in length usually around the upper thigh. The garment is often trimmed with lace, ruffles, appliques, marabou, bows, and ribbons, optionally with spaghetti straps. Sometimes it is made of sheer or translucent fabric such as nylon or chiffon or silk.

== History ==
The creation of the super-short nightgown is attributed to the American lingerie designer Sylvia Pedlar, who produced them in 1942 in response to fabric shortages during World War II. Although her designs became known as "babydolls", Pedlar disliked the name and did not use it.

In 1957 and 1958, the Spanish designer Cristóbal Balenciaga introduced his renditions of the babydoll. Balenciaga chose the silhouette as it already often featured an obscured waist; the exaggeration of this feature perfectly complimented his wish to experiment with proportions and blur the waistline.

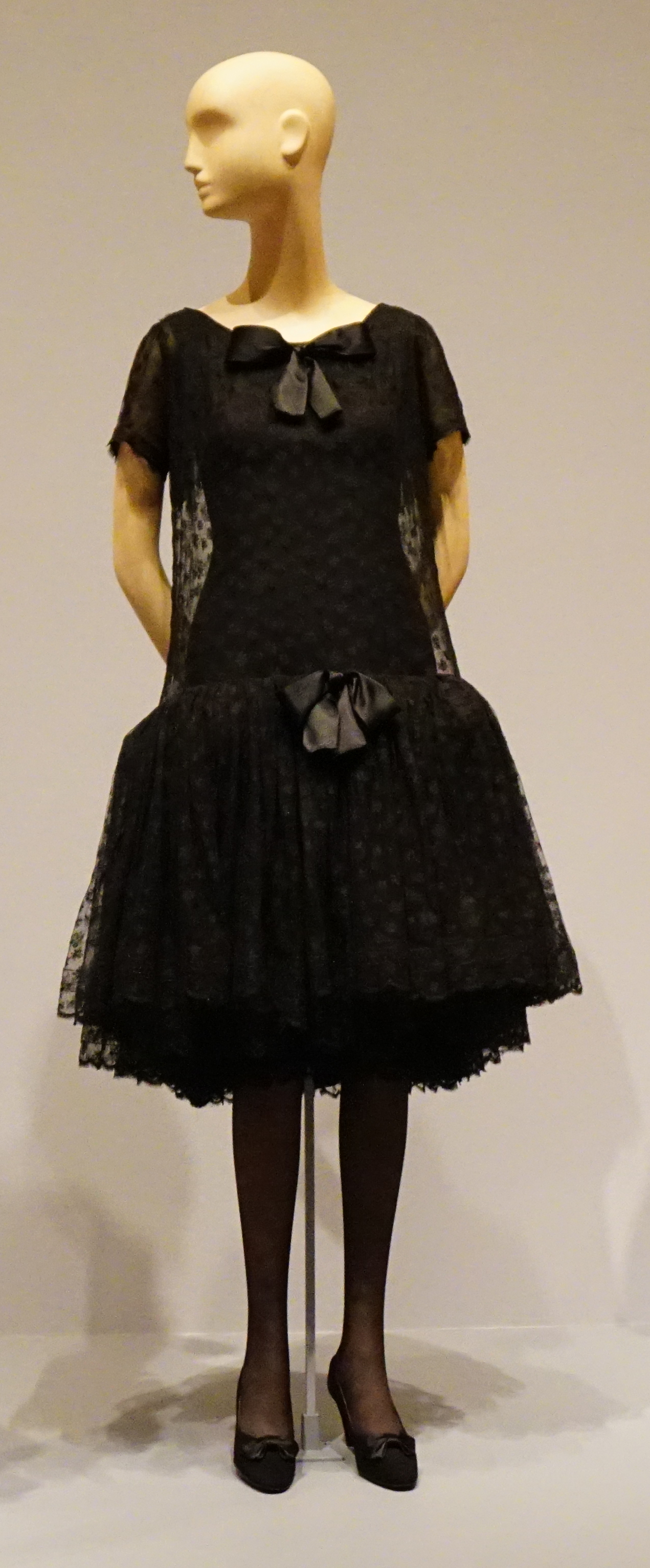
1958 Babydoll Dress by Balenciaga

The name was popularized by the 1956 movie Baby Doll, starring Carroll Baker in the title role as a 19-year-old nymphet. This marked the beginning of the enduring popularity of the style for adults. Babydoll pajamas in the 1950s through the 1960s consisted of a top and a loose-fitting short bloomer bottom with elasticized waist and legs. In the 1970s through the 1990s, the bloomer bottom was replaced by closer fitting briefs with elastic waist and legs. The most recent versions of babydoll pajamas have eliminated the elastic on the legs, the bottoms being either shorts or tap pants.

Babydolls became a prominent part of the "kinderwhore" look during the early-to-mid-1990s, due to the popularity of Riot Grrrl and grunge performers such as Courtney Love and Kat Bjelland.

== Contemporary styles ==
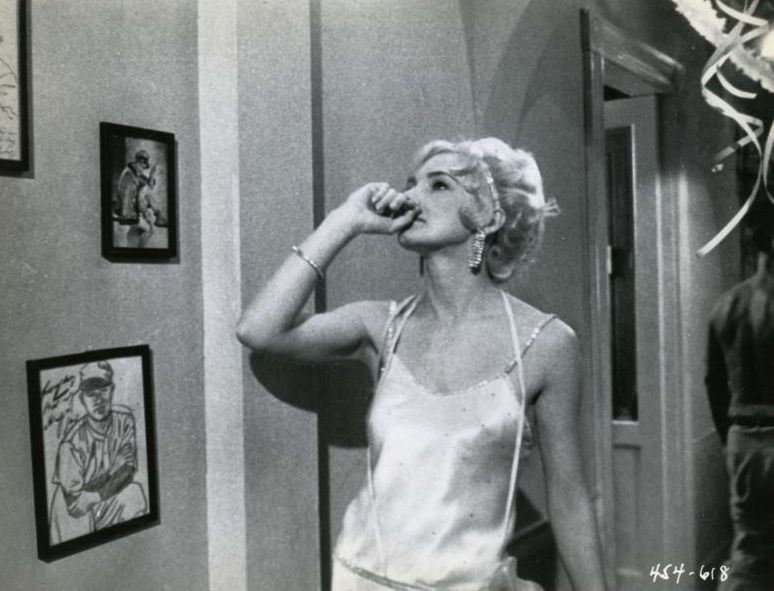
Barbara Loden wearing a babydoll in Splendor in the Grass (1961).

Babydolls are now considered an eroticized item of adult apparel, often classified as a form of lingerie. Adult babydolls are quite different from the infant babydolls; they fully expose the woman's legs, and some styles emphasize or deliberately expose the breasts as well. The gown is often sold as a set with matching panties, as a typical babydoll is short enough that underwear is visible if worn. Styles of the same general length but not intended to emphasize sex appeal are sometimes called shortie nightgowns.

Babydolls are available in a sufficiently wide variety of styles that many lingerie retailers consider babydolls a distinct department. Modern babydolls often vary considerably from the styles of the 1960s and 1970s. Babydoll negligees from the 1950s to the early 1980s are now collectible vintage items. Some babydolls open in front and resemble a robe or peignoir.

Short daywear dresses of a similar style are sometimes called babydoll dresses; the name is sometimes two words, baby doll, and sometimes hyphenated, baby-doll. Some styles are similar to what is worn by some infants; and by dolls designed like infants. The gown or top is short enough that diapers may be easily changed. An alternative origin for the style may be the lace-trimmed shortie bedjackets and bed-capes of the 1930s and 1940s.

In the 21st century, babydolls have become popular as bridal lingerie. They are more affordable than a bridal corset and often offer a greater choice of designs and colours.

== See also ==
- Chemise
- Miniskirt
