= Morning gown =

Morning gown may refer to:

- Morning dress
- Dressing gown
