= Olga Erteszek =

Polish-American undergarment designer and lingerie company owner

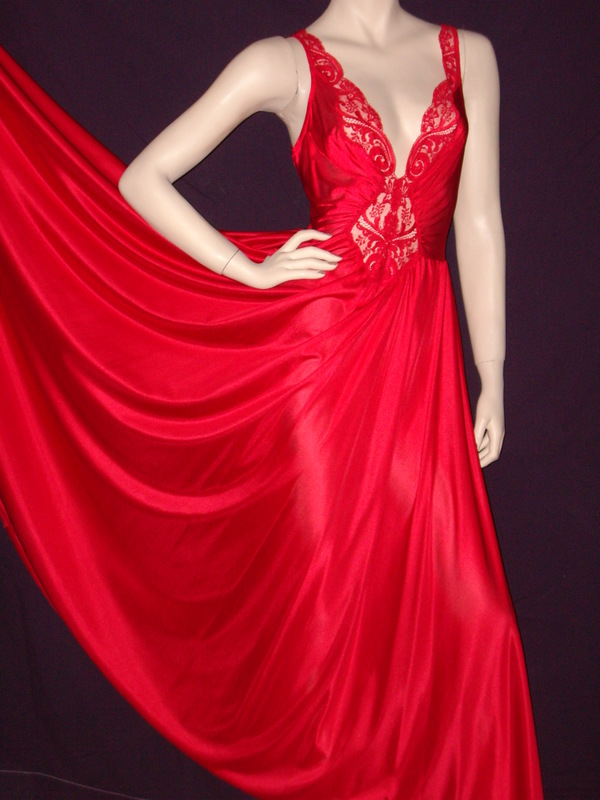
A red Olga nightgown

Olga Erteszek (June 15, 1916 – September 15, 1989) was a Polish-American undergarment designer and lingerie company owner. She was famous for her nightgowns with full, flowing skirt width and generous sweep.

== Early life ==
Otylia Erteszek, known as Olga, and her husband Jan (1913–1986), a criminal lawyer who previously bore the name Jakob, emigrated to the United States in 1941. Fleeing Poland and the invading Nazi army, the young couple left their family, emigrating to Russia and Japan. They both eventually secured visas for the United States and moved to California.

== Her company's history ==
As the daughter of a corsetiere, Olga worked in a sweatshop making girdles and bras. Meanwhile, Jan found work in sales. After spotting a woman on a trolley with hosiery rolled to her knees, Olga noted that many women didn't have at least some bit of finery to hold up their stockings. Jan encouraged her to create something herself to address the problem.

Olga sewed a dozen or so lace-trimmed garter belts that Jan sold to a buyer at an elite department store. Enduring from the 1940s to today, Olga was known as a leading makers of fashionable lingerie, sleepwear and loungewear in the United States. Jan - who was the head marketing and sales director - insisted that Olga herself must appear in the advertisements with the tagline: “Behind every Olga, there really is an Olga.”

Olga held the women's record for patents at 28. Olga and her husband were honoured for community and humanitarian work. In 1985, they received the California Industrialist of the Year Award for lifetime achievement. The eponymous Olga was one of the first businesses to initiate profit sharing for employees. In 1967, it became a publicly owned corporation valued at US$67 million. In 1984, Olga was ranked as a Fortune 500 company and one of the best 100 companies to work for in America.

== Ownership changes ==
In 1984, Olga's company was purchased by Warnaco for US$28 million, which Olga and Jan felt was a wise choice as both companies had the same congruent philosophies. Shortly after this, however, a hostile takeover of Warnaco changed the culture of Olga drastically. In 1986, the same year that Olga and Christina – Olga's daughter and heir – were honoured with New York's The Underfashion Club's Femmy Award. Jan died in 1986. The Intimate Apparel Council honoured her with their first Intime Award.

== Notable items ==
One notable piece of lingerie Erteszek designed was the Built-In Bra Nightgown.

== Personal life ==
Erteszek and Jan had a daughter, Christina, in 1949.

== Death ==
Erteszek died of breast cancer in September 1989 at her home in Brentwood, California.

== Sources ==
- Susan Ware & Stacy Braukman (eds) (2004). Notable American Women: a biographical dictionary completing the twentieth century. Belknap Press. ISBN 0-674-01488-X
- Guide to Vintage Olga Lingerie - Company history and trademarks http://www.vintagepavement.com/guide-vintage-olga-nightgowns-lingerie/
