= Nightcap (garment) =

Soft cap worn while sleeping

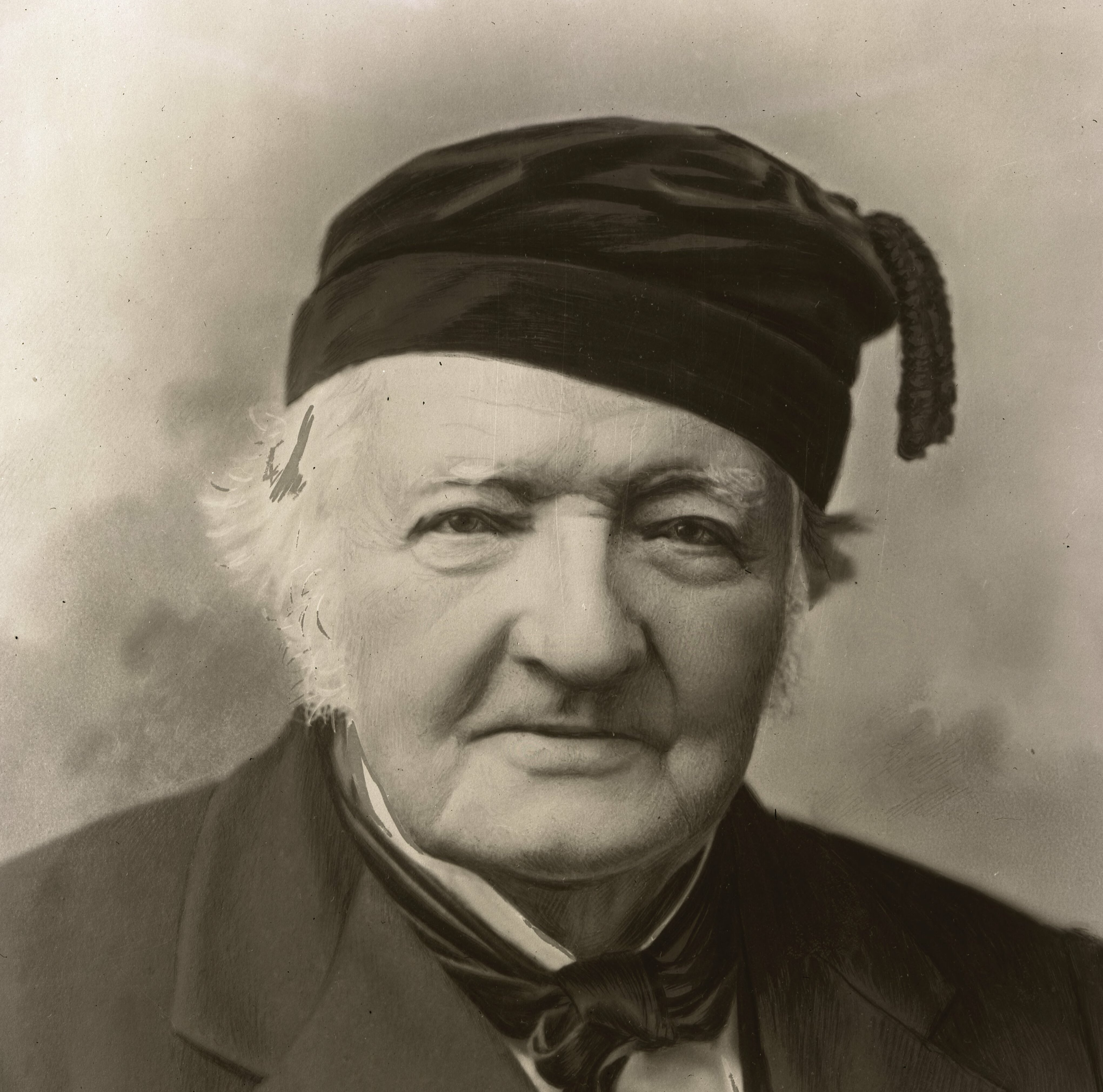
Portrait of Henry Shaw wearing a nightcap.

A nightcap is a cloth cap worn with other nightwear such as pajamas, a onesie, a nightshirt, or a nightgown; historically worn in the cold climates of Northern Europe. Nightcaps are somewhat similar to knit caps worn for warmth outdoors.

== Design ==
Women's night caps were usually a long piece of cloth wrapped around the head, or a triangular cloth tied under the chin. Men's nightcaps were traditionally pointed hats with a long top, sometimes with a pom-pom on the end. The long end could be used like a scarf to keep the back of the neck warm.

== History ==
From the Middle Ages to the 20th century, nightcaps were worn in Northern Europe, such as the British Isles and Scandinavia, especially during the cold winters before central heating became available. A nightcap was worn in an attempt to create a safe and comfortable sleeping environment.

In the Tyburn and Newgate days of British judicial hanging history, the hood used to cover the prisoner's face was a nightcap supplied by the prisoner, if he could afford it.

Nightcaps were worn by many women in the Victorian era, but were seen as old-fashioned by the Edwardian era. Some women still wore nightcaps, similar to mobcaps, to protect their elaborate curly hairstyles that were fashionable. Edwardian men wore nightcaps as well.

In the 1920s and 1930s, the boudoir cap became popular among some European women.

== Fiction ==
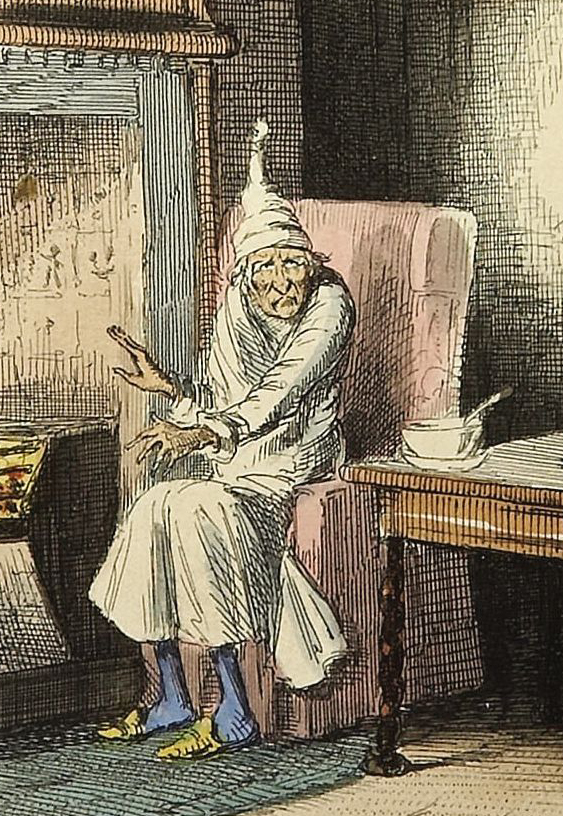
Ebenezer Scrooge from Charles Dickens's A Christmas Carol wearing his nightshirt and nightcap. Illustration by John Leech.

Nightcaps are less commonly worn in modern times, but are often featured in animation and other media, as part of a character's nightwear. Nightcaps became associated with the fictional sleepers Ebenezer Scrooge and Wee Willie Winkie. The hat has become typical nightwear for a sleeper especially in comical drawings or cartoons along with children's stories, plays, and films. The character Deutscher Michel, a national personification of the German people, is commonly depicted wearing a nightcap and nightgown, with various interpretations as to their meaning.

== Related caps ==
People with curly and kinky hair hair often wear a form of night cap to protect their hair while sleeping, typically a silk or satin wrap, durag or bonnet.

== See also ==
- Smoking cap
- List of hat styles
- List of headgear
