= Gown =

Full-length woman's garment

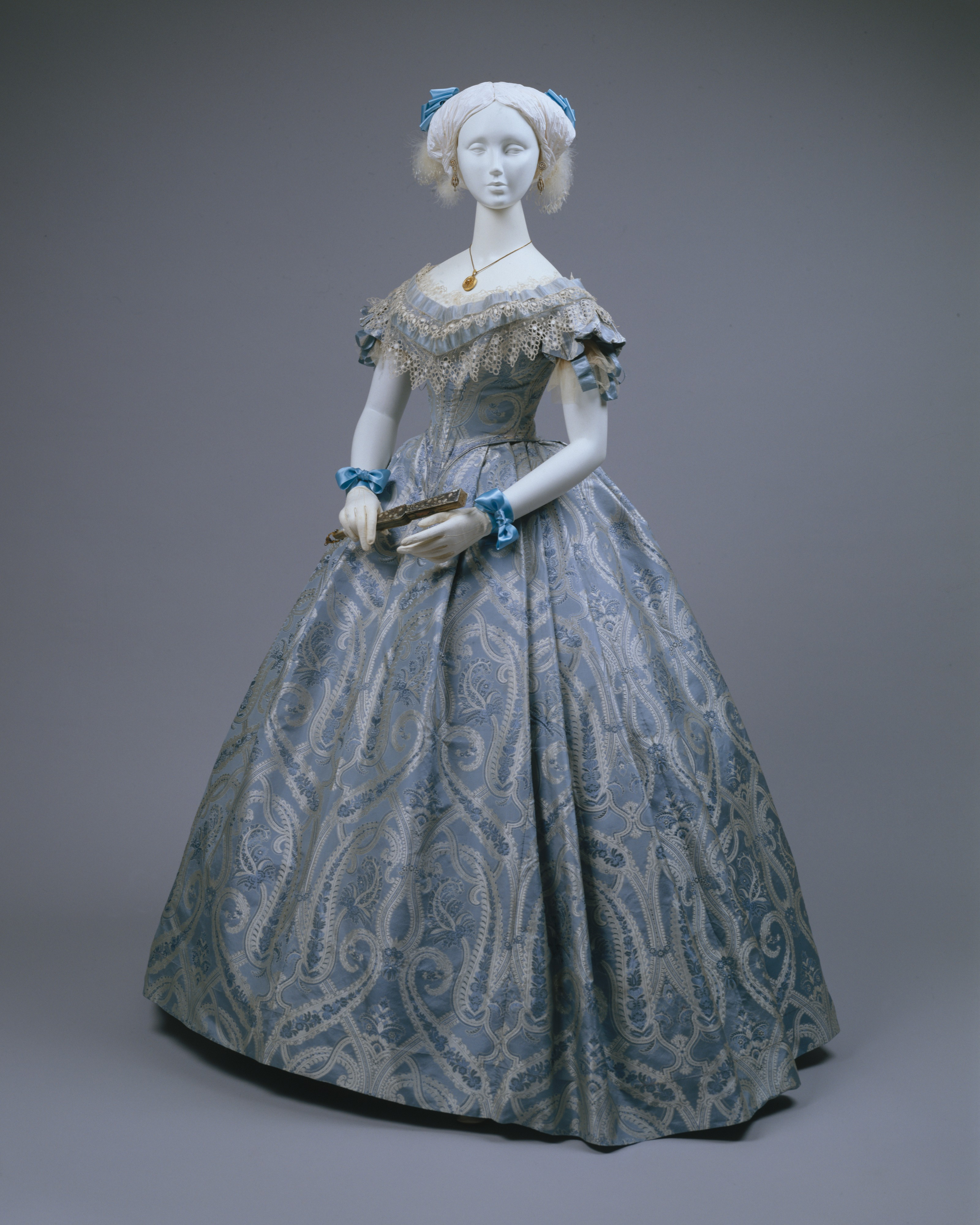
American silk and cotton ball gown, circa 1860, Metropolitan Museum of Art

A gown, from the Latin word, gunna, is a usually loose outer garment from knee-to-full-length worn by people of both sexes in Europe from the Early Middle Ages to the 17th century, and continuing today in certain professions; later, the term gown was applied to any full-length woman's garment consisting of a bodice and an attached skirt. A long, loosely fitted gown called a Banyan was worn by men in the 18th century as an informal coat.

The gowns worn today by academics, judges, and some clergy derive directly from the everyday garments worn by their medieval predecessors, formalised into a uniform in the course of the 16th and 17th centuries.

== Terminology ==
A modern-day gown refers to several types of garments. It can refer to a dress, especially a formal or fancy dress. It may also refer to a nightgown or a dressing gown. In academia, and other traditional areas, such as the legal world, gowns are also worn on various formal or ceremonial occasions.

== History ==
The gunna was worn by Anglo-Saxon women and consisted of a long, loose outer garment. The gunna was also called a cote, surcoat, or robe.

Gowns were worn by students attending early European universities in the 12th and 13th centuries. The gowns, and the hoods that accompanied them, would indicate their status. From the 14th to the 17th centuries, the term "gown" was used to describe any long, loose, robe-like garment.

In the 1500s in Italy, a gown was known as a camora or by regional names in various locations. The look of the camora changed over time, starting out with a high waist and low neckline at the beginning of the century and gradually becoming low-waisted and high-necked by the end. Italian women also wore an overgown called a vestito or a roba. In turn, these might be covered by a robone which was lined with fabrics or furs for warmth.

By the late 16th century, gowns were no longer in style in Italy except where they were worn to denote a professional station, such as a banker or priest.

In the 17th century, women's gowns in the American colonies included trimming around the neck and down the bodice, or in the case of an open gown, down front edges from hem to neck. Gowns may also have borders of silk, ribbons, and other decorations. Women in the American colonies wore short gowns as working clothing and informal clothing during the 18th century. The gowns were t-shaped and had side godets for additional volume.

== See also ==
- Banyan (clothing)
- Grand boubou, a gown of West Africa
- Clothing terminology
- Dress
- Frock
- List of individual dresses
- Robe
- Skirt
- 1550–1600 in fashion
- 1600–1650 in fashion

=== Types of gowns ===
- Academic dress (cap and gown)
- Ball gown
- Bedgown
- Bouffant gown
- Coronation gown
- Evening gown
- Hospital gown
- Nightgown
- Tea gown
- Wedding gown
- Sheer fabric
- Décolletage
