= Boudoir =

Women's private sitting room

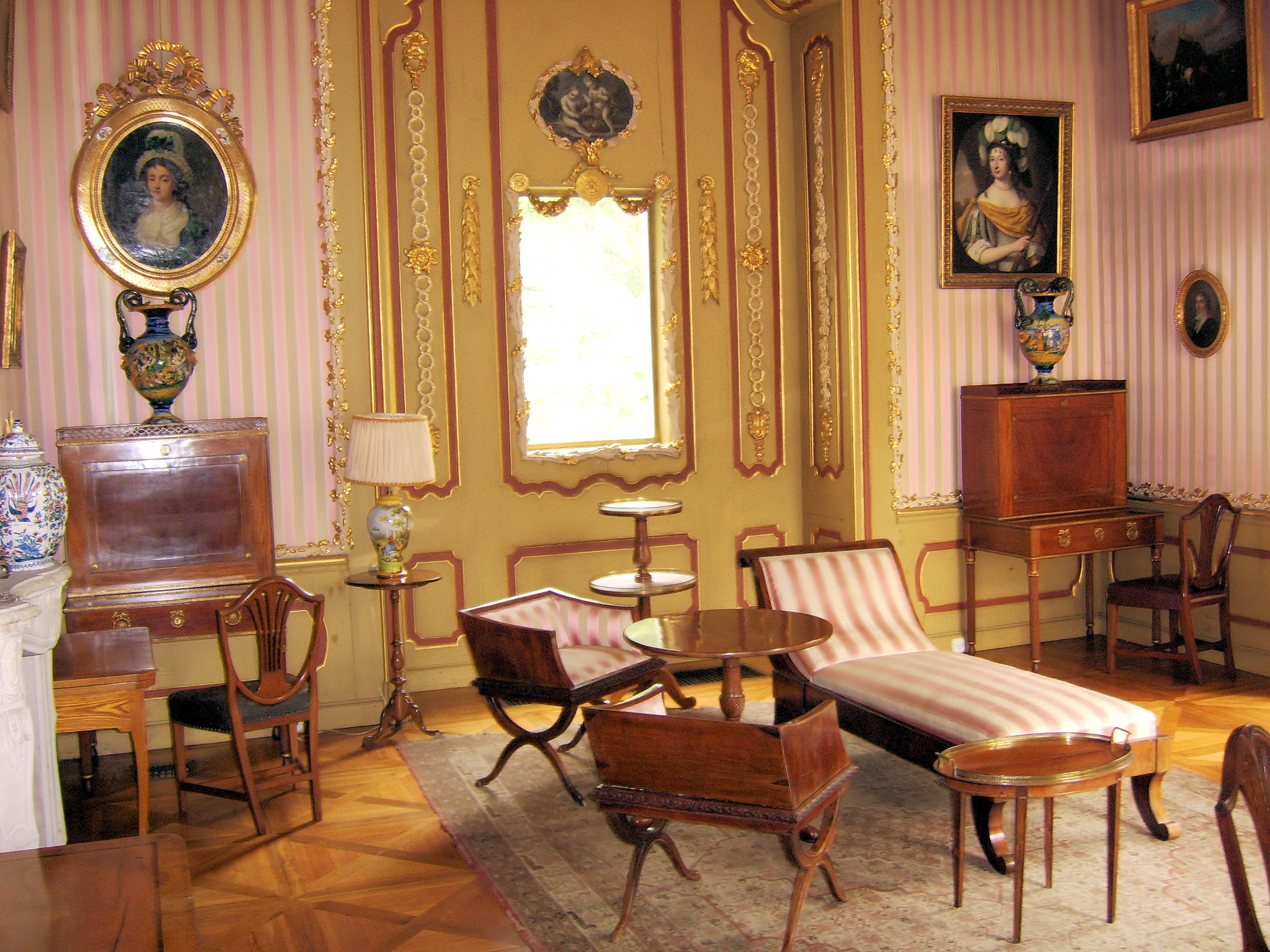
A neo-rococo decor boudoir in Nieborów Palace, Poland.

A boudoir (/buːˈdwɑːr/ boo-DWAR; French: [budwaʁ]) is a lady’s private sitting room or salon in a furnished residence, usually between the dining room and the bedroom, but can also refer to a lady’s private bedroom. The term derives from the French verb bouder (to sulk or pout) or adjective boudeur (sulking)—the room was originally a space to withdraw to.

== Architecture ==
A cognate of the English "bower", historically, the boudoir formed part of the private suite of rooms of a "lady" or upper-class woman, for bathing and dressing, adjacent to her bedchamber, being the female equivalent of the male cabinet. In later periods, the boudoir was used as a private drawing room, and was used for other activities, such as embroidery or spending time with one's husband.

English-language usage varies between countries, and is now largely historical. In the United Kingdom, in the period when the term was most often used (Victorian era and early 20th century), a boudoir was a lady's evening sitting room, and was separate from her morning room, and her dressing room. As this multiplicity of rooms with overlapping functions suggests, boudoirs were generally found only in grand houses. In the United States, in the same era, boudoir was an alternative term for dressing room, favored by those who felt that French terms conferred more prestige.

In Caribbean English, a boudoir is the front room of the house where women entertain family and friends.

== Furnishing ==
Recently, the term boudoir has come to denote a style of furnishing for the bedroom that is traditionally described as ornate or busy. The plethora of links available on the Internet to furnishing sites using the term boudoir tend to focus on Renaissance and French inspired bedroom styles. In recent times, they have also been used to describe the 'country cottage' style with whitewashed-style walls, large and heavy bed furniture, and deep bedding.

== Gallery ==
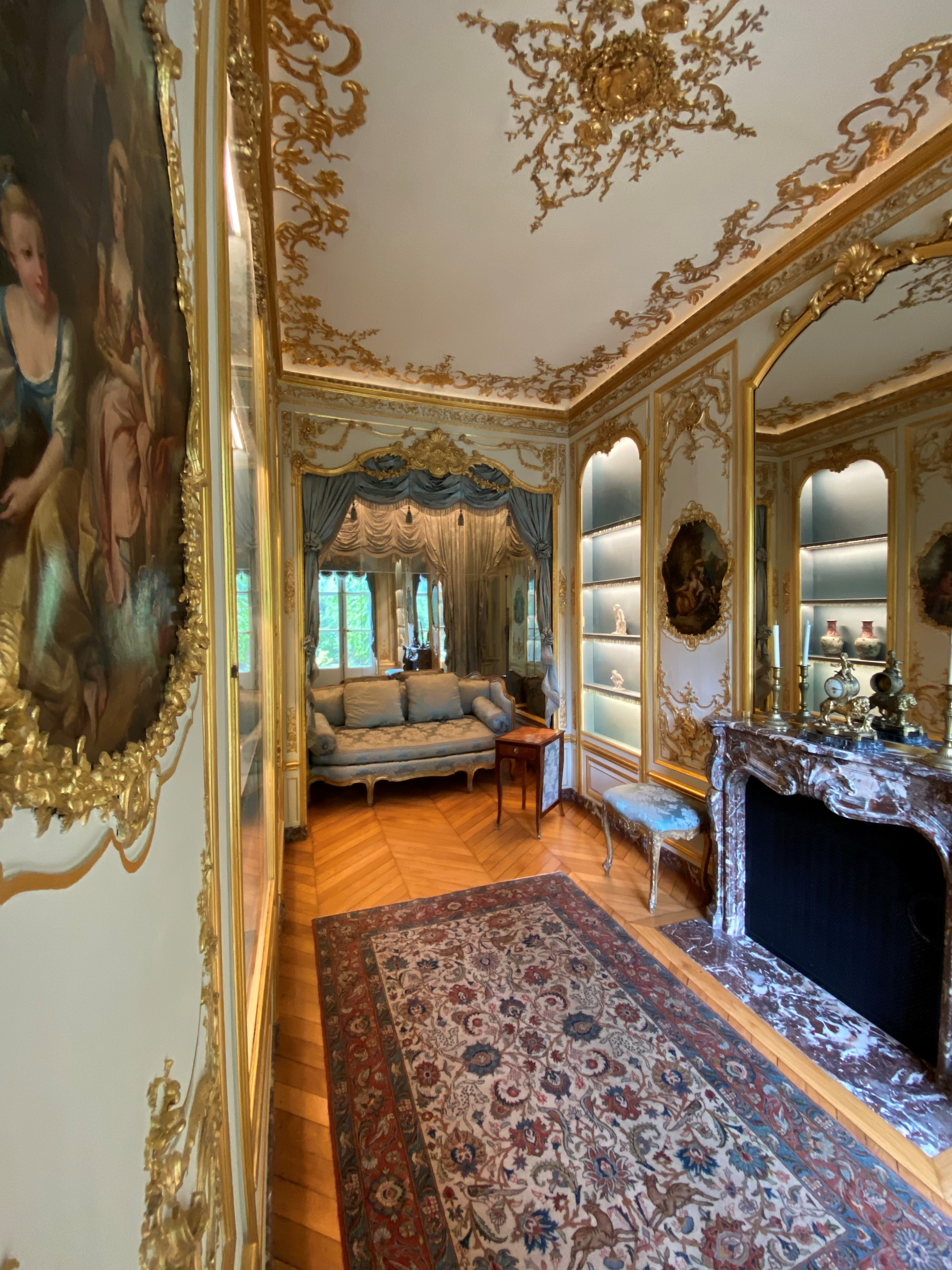
Boudoir at the Hôtel de Besenval in Paris

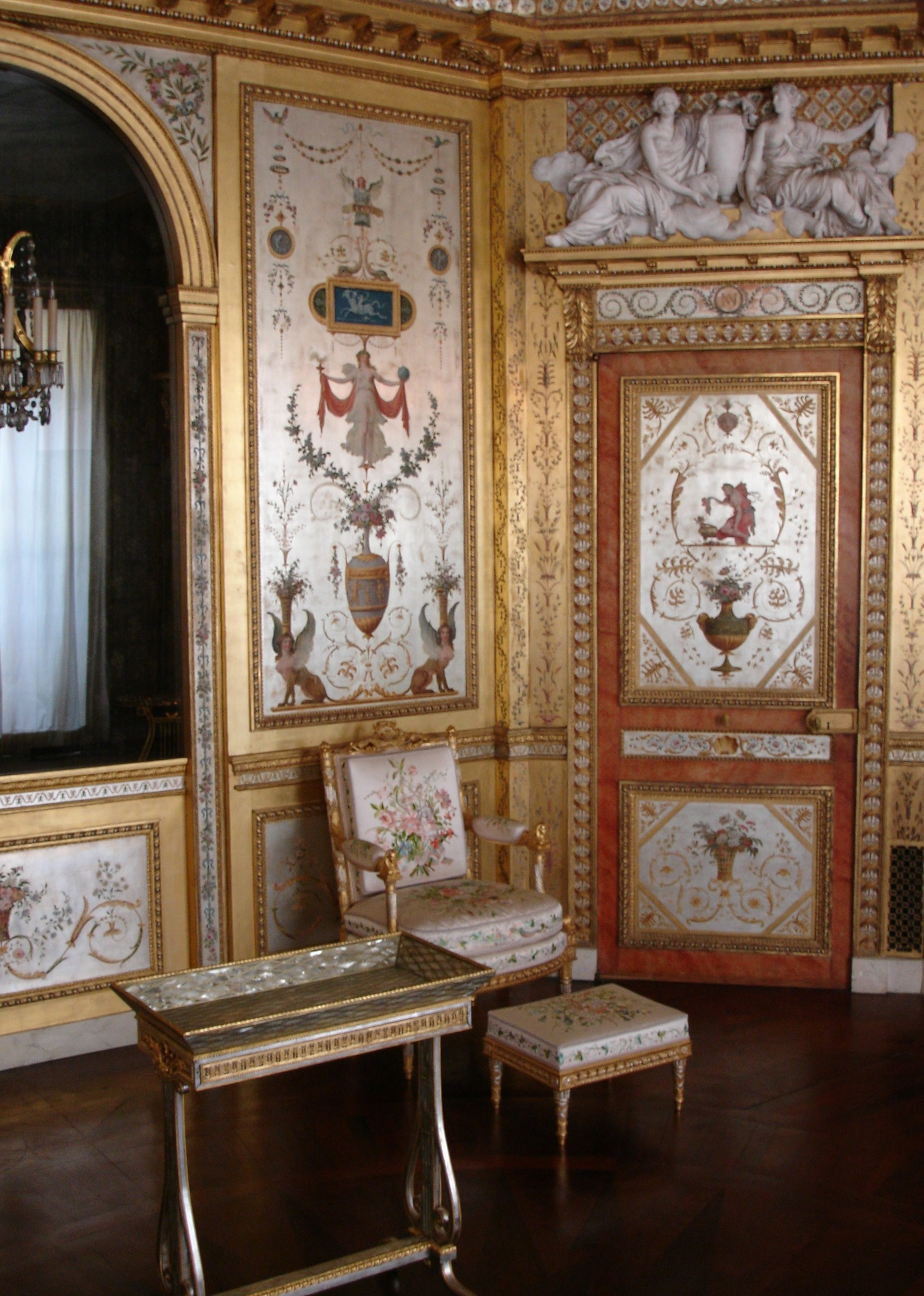
Boudoir of Marie Antoinette in Fontainebleau Palace, France

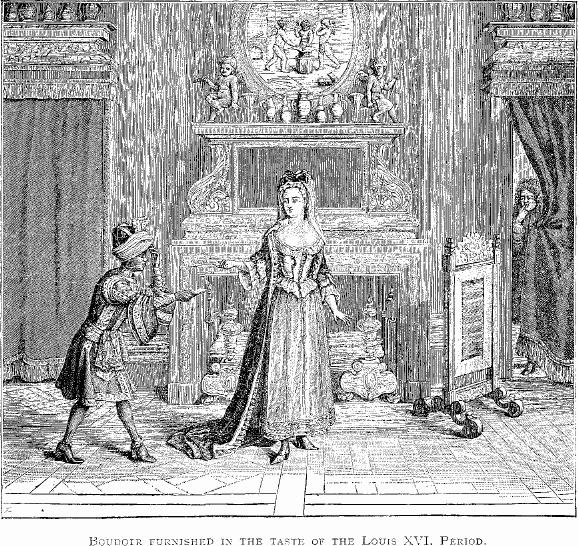
Illustration of a boudoir, in the style at the time of Louis XVI, by Frederick Litchfield, from Illustrated History of Furniture, From the Earliest to the Present Time (1893)

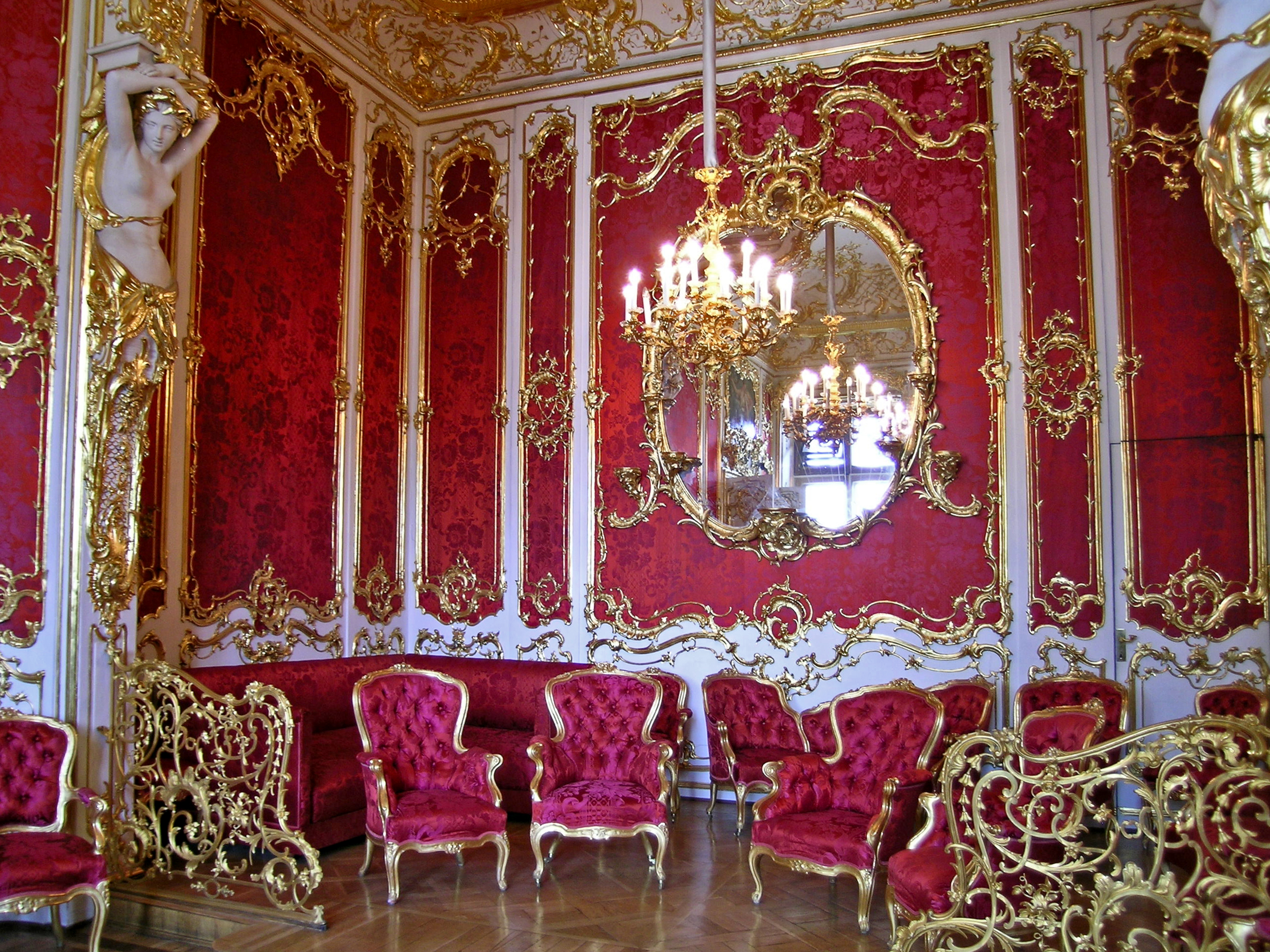
Boudoir of Empress Maria Alexandrovna in the Winter Palace at the State Hermitage (Saint Petersburg)

== See also ==
- Boudoir cap
- Harem
- Ladyfinger (biscuit), which translates as boudoirs in French
