= Coronation gown =

A coronation gown is a gown worn by a royal lady becoming a queen at her coronation.

Coronation gown may refer to:

- Coronation gown of Queen Victoria
- Coronation gown of Alexandra of Denmark
- Coronation gown of Mary of Teck
- Coronation gown of Elizabeth Bowes-Lyon
- Coronation gown of Elizabeth II
- Coronation gown of Camilla Shand
