= Nightgown =

Shirtlike garment intended for wear while sleeping most often used by women

A nightgown

A nightgown, nightie or nightdress is a loosely hanging item of nightwear, and is commonly worn by women and girls. A nightgown is made from cotton, silk, satin, or nylon and may be decorated with lace appliqués or embroidery at the bust and hem.

A nightgown may have any neckline, and may have sleeves of any type, or be sleeveless, and any shoulder strap or back style. The length of a nightgown may vary from hip-length to floor-length. A short nightgown can be called a "shortie" or a "babydoll", depending on the style. The sweep (taper from top to bottom) of the night gown can vary from virtually straight, to full circle sweep, like the Olga gown. A slip nightgown may be used as a nightgown or as a full slip. Nightgowns may be worn with a matching outer garment such as a robe, a sheer chiffon peignoir, or a dressing gown, to make them appropriate for receiving guests.

== History ==
=== Early nightgowns ===
An early translation of "night gown" as "sloppe" (Middle English), or "robe de nuit" (French) exist as early as 1530 in L'éclaircissement de la langue française by French linguist John Palsgrave There is no indication whether the term referred to sleepwear or an item of clothing with a different purpose, however. There, additionally, is little evidence of designated sleepwear prior to the 16th century. European portraiture from the Middle Ages suggests men and women commonly slept naked, sometimes with a nightcap. Some historians suggest a lack of record of early sleepwear is due to social attitudes. Sleepwear was widely regarded as a private matter within households until it became more popularized.

Modern nightgowns originate from nightshirts on men, or night-chemises on women which date back to as early as the 16th century. Nightshirts and night-chemises tended to just be day shirts or undergarments and were similarly ankle-length, shapeless articles with varying collars. Nightshirts resembled tunics; worn by both sexes for centuries in Egypt and Rome. They tended to be made from white linen so as to be easily washed and absorbent. Nobles and Lords however wore nightshirts that were embroidered.

It was not until the late 17th century that sleepwear developed its own identity in Western Europe, and higher-class women began to wear chemise-like gowns exclusively to bed, known as nightshifts. Nightshifts developed more shape when the negligée was born in France in the early 18th century. The negligée was typically made with soft-sheer fabric and was tighter around the waist, but still loose-fitting for comfort. It was also a sign of wealth and is regarded as the first women's nightwear to be used widely and a predecessor to the modern nightgown. According to historians Willet and Phillis Cunnington, only small adjustments were made to nightdresses up until the late 19th century because of social attitudes; trimmings of lace or tighter fits were viewed "as a sign of depravity that went against the highest principles of prudery in the English lady".

=== Nightgowns as dressing gowns: 18th and early 19th centuries ===
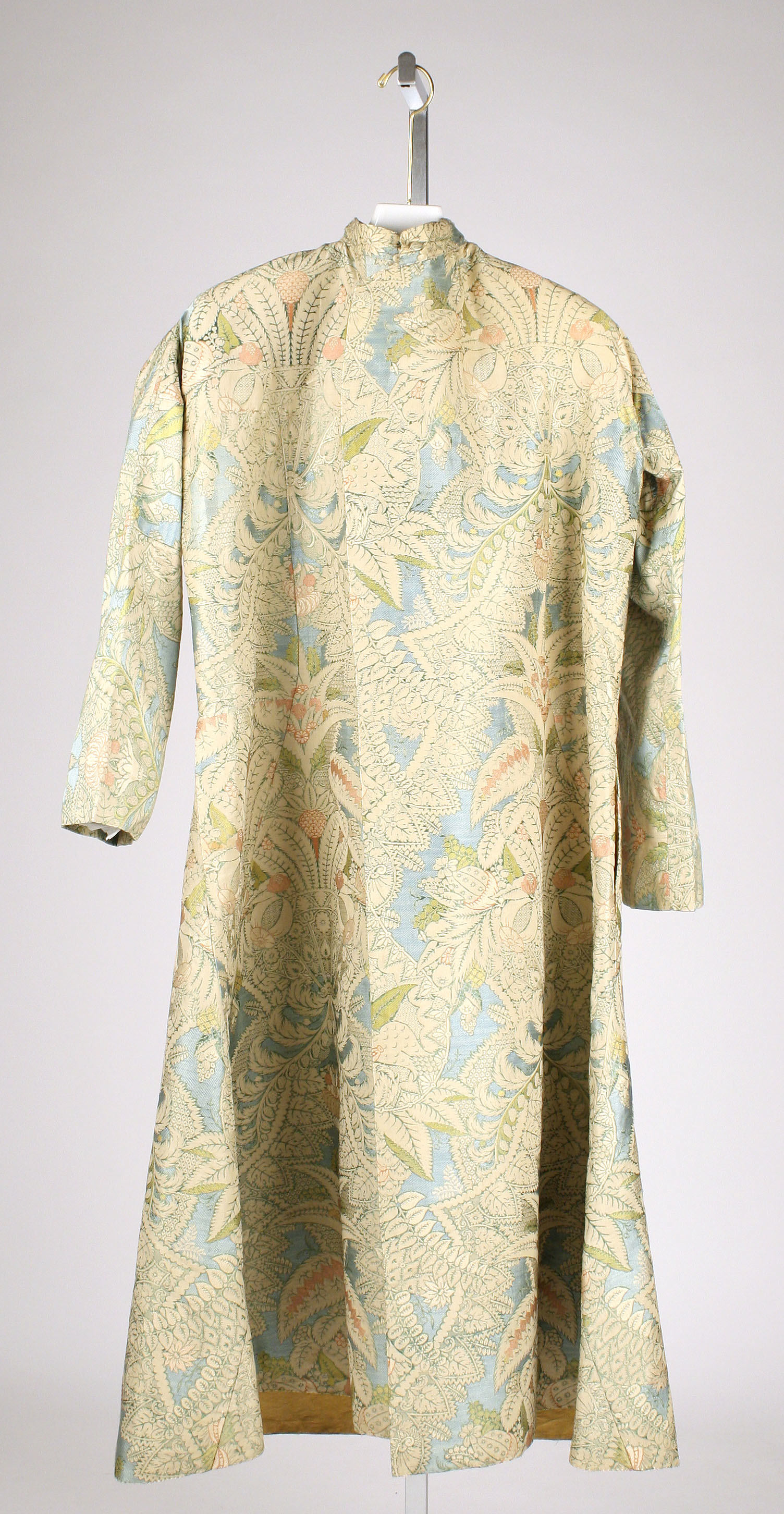
French banyan style dressing gown, or nightgown, 1730

Prior to the late 19th century, the term "nightgown" referred not to sleepwear but rather to informal wear. The nightgown was a "version of a modern dressing gown" and tended to be worn around the house or to occasions when formal attire was not necessary. This garment was actually a Banyan, a T-shirt shaped robe adopted by the British from India but became known as a "nightgown", dressing gown or "morning gown" in the early 1700s due to its casual nature.

Nightgowns, or dressing gowns, were predominantly worn by men. English variations of the nightgown or dressing gown were influenced by similar gowns from India, Japan and the Middle East. In the early 18th century, the kimono style became popular. It was loose fitting and fit over men like a coat. The gown "consists of two widths of fabric seamed at center back up to the neck, where it joins a small rectangle of fabric to build up the neckline. Each width of fabric then falls over the shoulders to create the gown front. Additional widths of fabric form the sleeves. V-shaped inserts could be sewn at the side seams for additional fullness."

Nightgowns were also typically made from cotton or silk (damask, brocade, velvet, taffeta, and satin) or wool with linings using satin or lutestring in a bright, contrasting color. The material varied based on the weather and the person wearing the gown. In colder seasons, nightgowns would have fur linings. Trade throughout Europe and Asia from the 16th to 18th centuries led to the foreign fabrics and styles used for nightgowns in Western Europe and America. Exotic associations popularized the nightgown, especially in the kimono or banyan style. Fashion historian Patricia Cunningham has also suggested “the cut of the gown may derive from Persian and Turkish caftans”.

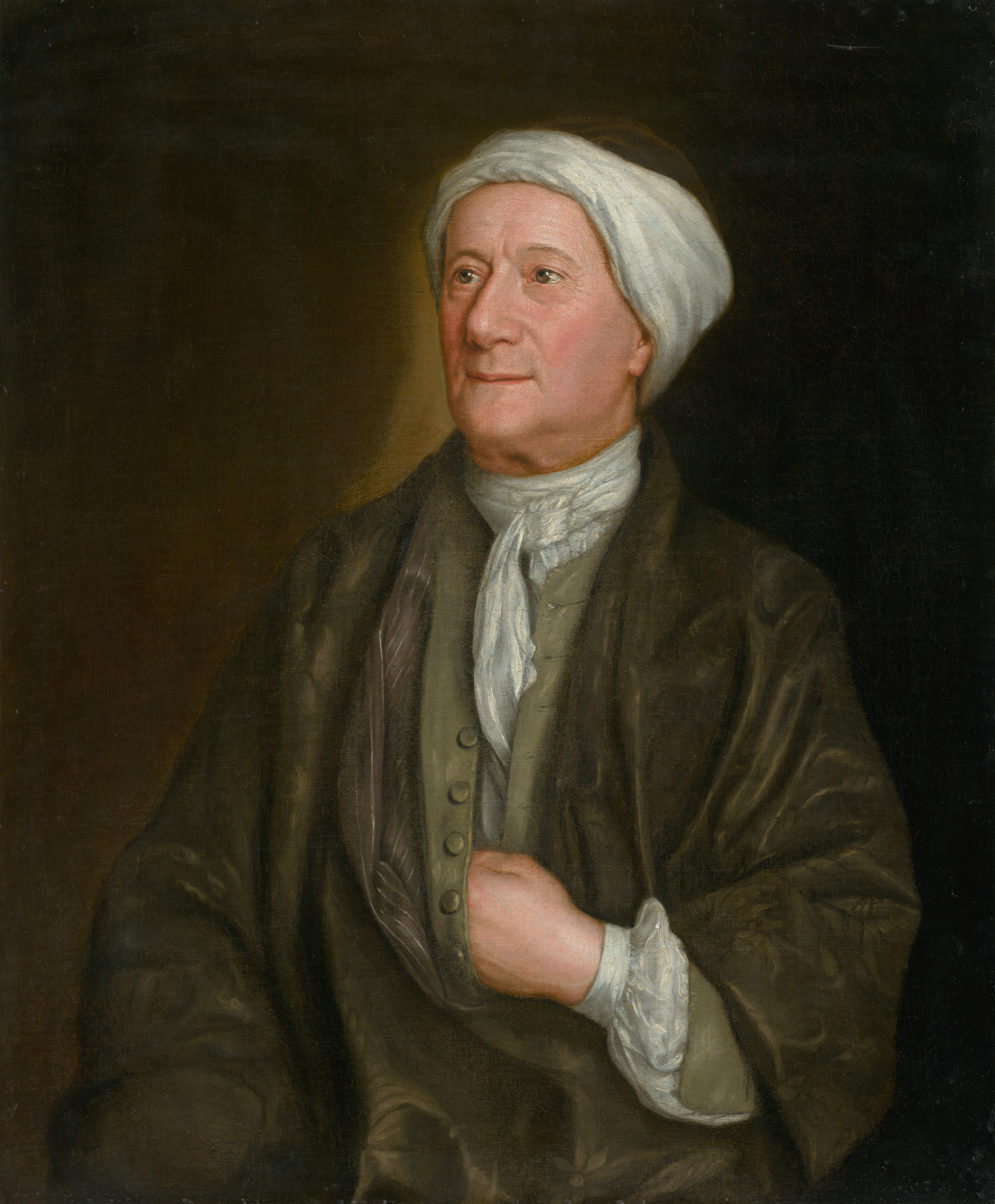
1730 portrait by John Smibert of a man in an 18th-century nightgown

Nightgowns or dressing gowns also increased in demand because of portraiture and implications of status. The garment is seen throughout portraits in the 17th and 18th centuries. "The adoption of the gown by the English may date from the 16th century when Henry VIII wore what appears to be an Islamic caftan with frogged closure for a portrait by Holbein". Cunningham points to paintings "The Apothecary's Shop" (1752) and "The Concert" (1741) which "illustrate the apparent appropriateness of the gown for both professional and social occasions".

=== 19th and 20th centuries ===
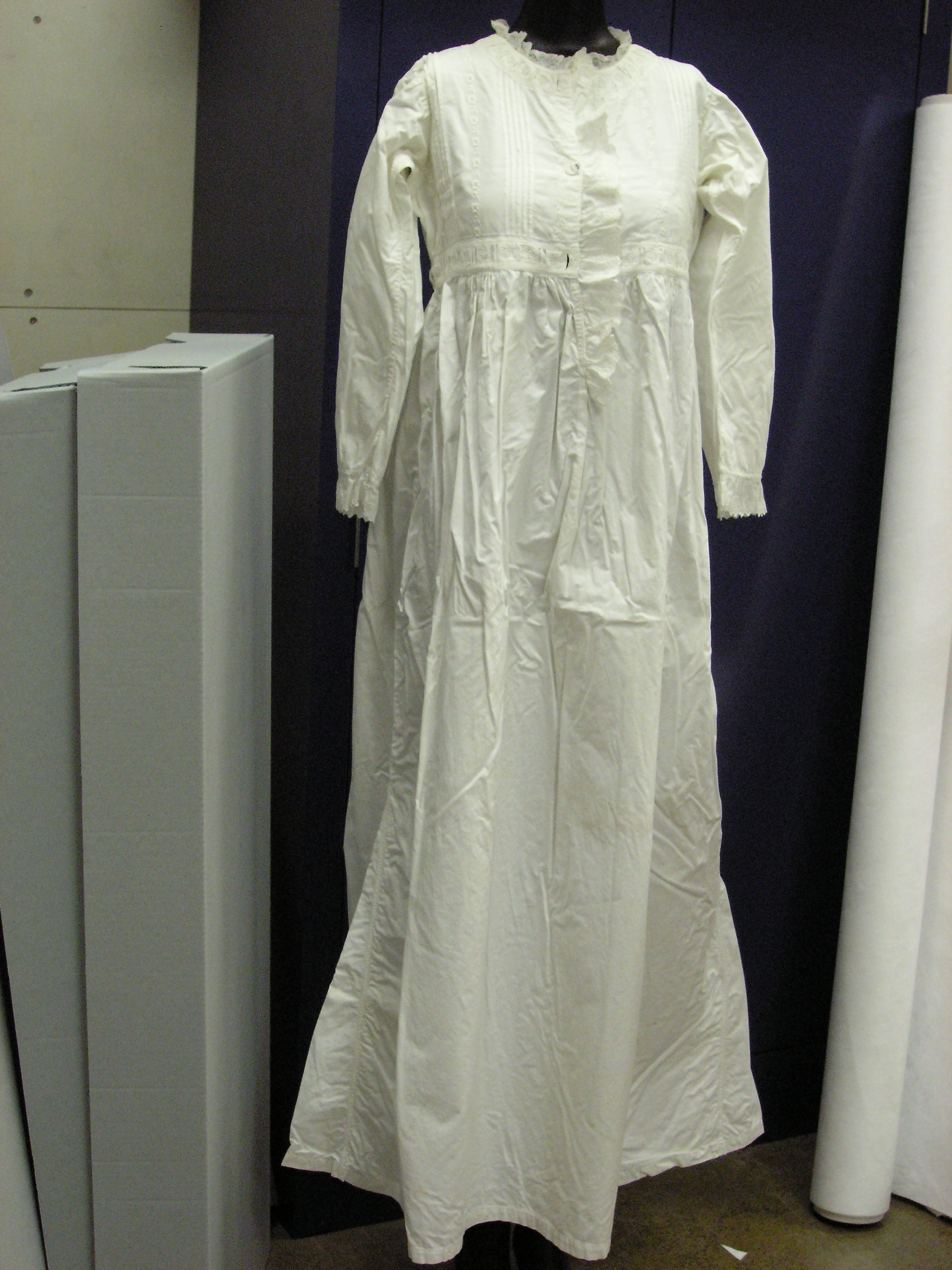
19th-century simple white cotton nightgown with embroidery insertion and lace trimming

From 1840 to 1900, stylistic changes were made to nightgowns' necklines, collars, sleeves, bodices and closures. The traditional nightshirt was replaced by pyjamas amongst the Western world when it was adopted from India in 1870. Pyjamas soon became an essential item in men's wardrobes because of their comfort and exotic connotations. Female pyjamas were introduced in 1886 and were a combination of a nightgown and pants. French designer Coco Chanel was the first to release a line of attractive women's pyjamas which coaxed along their popularity.

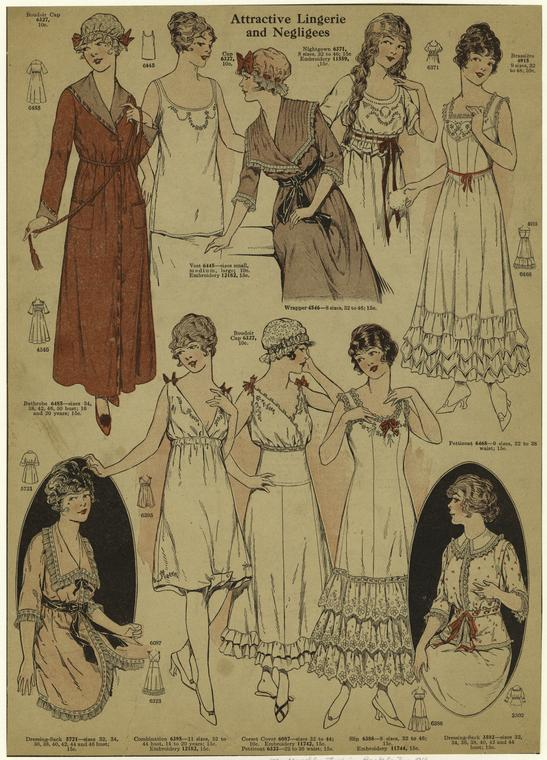
1915 magazine advertisement for negligee nightgowns

Despite the introduction of pyjamas, the popularity of the nightgown grew drastically in the 1920s. Between 1920 and 1940, nightgowns did not curve the body but draped down in a straight line. This is widely attributed to French designer Madeleine Vionnet who rejected corsets and became famous "cutting fabric along the bias". Her styles accentuated curves while also providing fluidity and comfort. During this time, nightgowns also moved from domestic use to fashion statements. In 1933, trend setter Mary d'Erlanger wore a nightgown cut low in the front and back to a ball in New York popularizing the elegance of the style. This style, now referred to as the "slip dress" made a resurgence in the 1990s. The middle of the 19th century saw more tailored nightgowns which were full skirted with figure-hugging bodices, reflecting trends of the time. By the 1960s, nightgowns were completely diversified, found in varieties of lengths, patterns, and fabrics.

=== 21st century ===
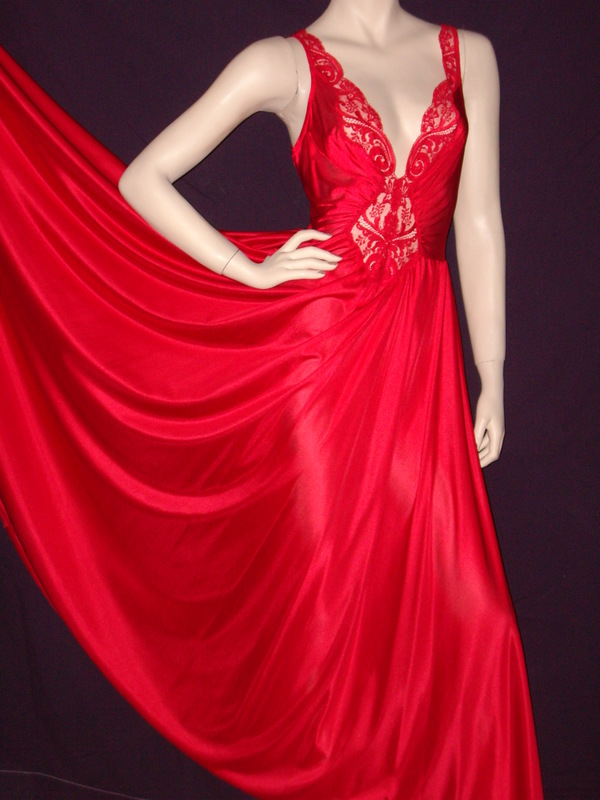
Olga nightgown

In the 21st century, nightgowns are predominantly worn by women. Common modern nightgown styles are made from cotton, satin, silk or lace and have embroidery or lace details with thin shoulder straps. Nightgowns have several different variations. Longer, cotton nightgowns are often referred to as "Victorian Nightgowns", having been influenced by similar styles in the late 19th century. Shorter nightgowns are also known as "nighties" and a common style is the "babydoll" nightgown which is generally lace and silk with a V-neckline. Other variations are the "shirt style" nightgown or the "slip dress" nightgown.

The variety of styles of nightgowns have pushed into daywear and are also often seen on the runway. Nightgown influence has been seen in street style clothes as well as high fashion. In the 1990s, designer Calvin Klein developed a line of nightgown style dresses which were simple, silk gowns that were short or reached the floor. As recently as 2019, actor Gwyneth Paltrow wore a sheer yellow lace nightgown on the red carpet at the Met Gala with a high neck and filled collar much like one from the 19th century. Other trends like beach slip tunics have been linked to the first variations of the nightgown, or nightdress, in the 17th and 18th centuries. Some scholars suggest that as daywear has become more relaxed over time, it has allowed for the nightgown to be repurposed into different styles people wear every day.

== Gallery ==
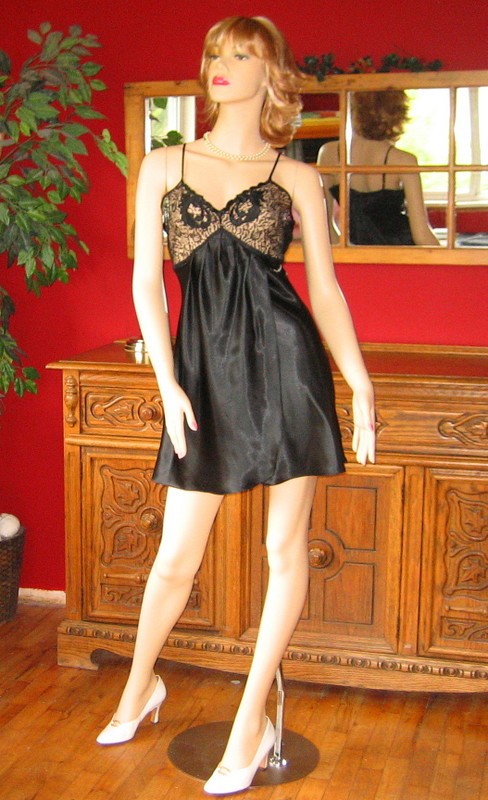
Black slip nightgown

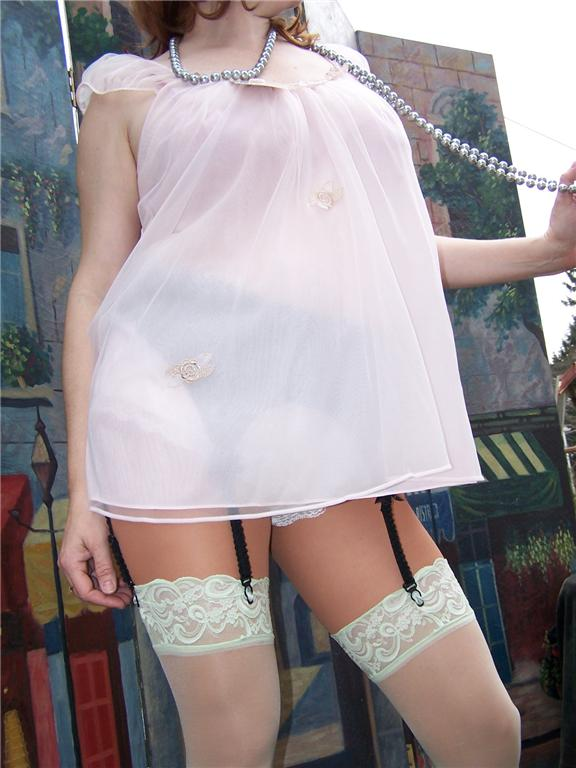
Babydoll nightgown
