= Dressing gown =

Type of clothing, loose-fitting outer garment

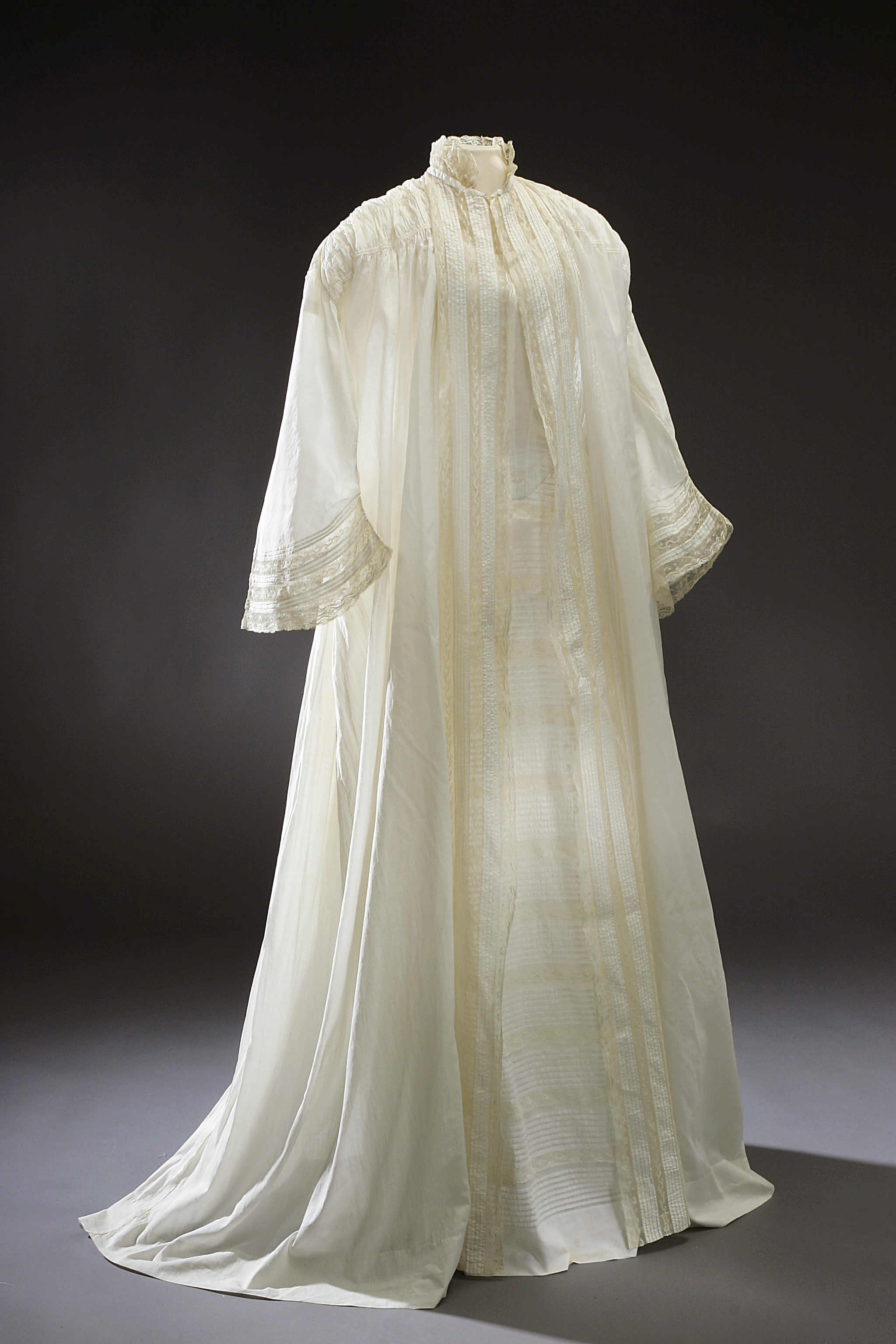
A dressing gown from the 1850s

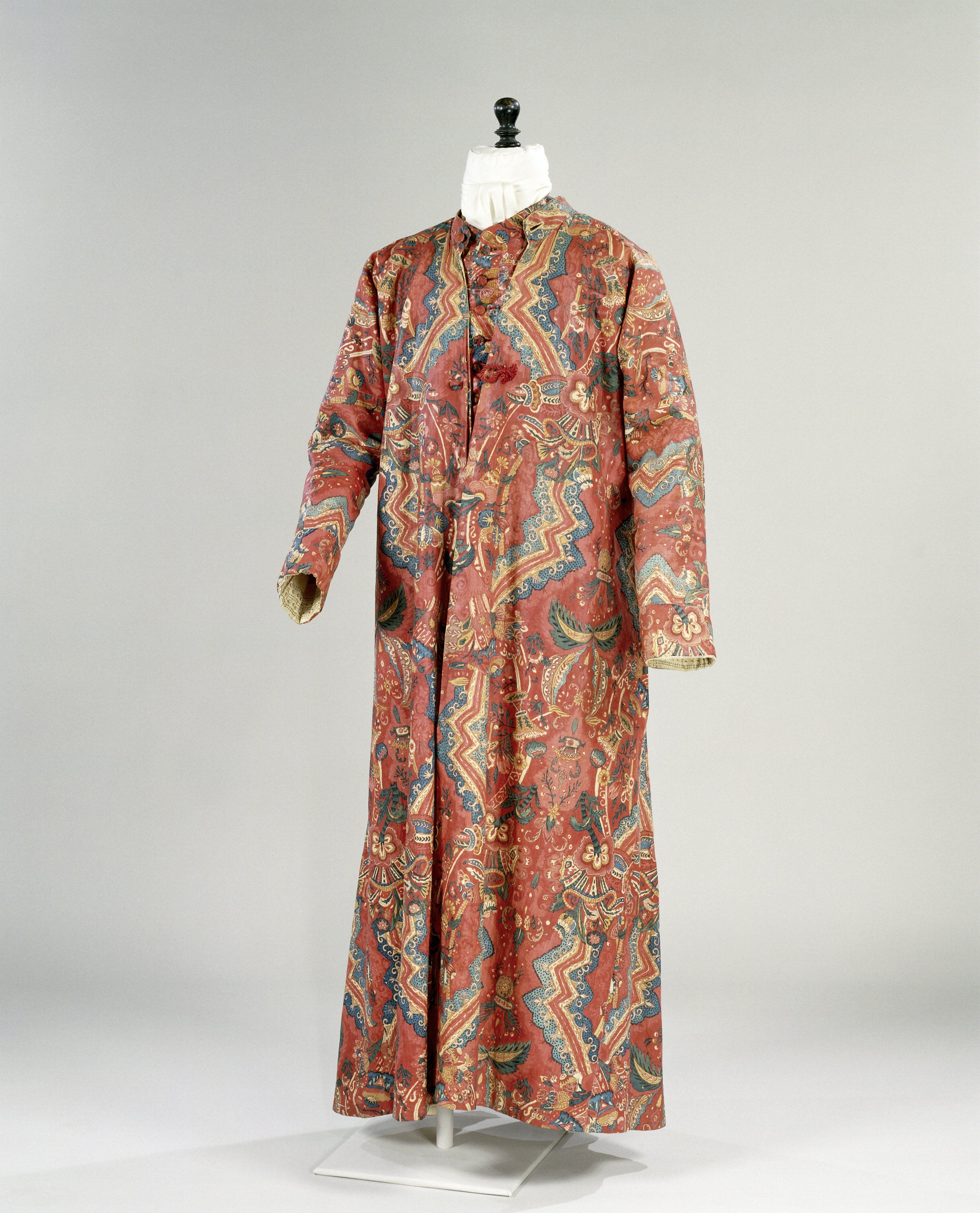
A banyan type housecoat made in the Netherlands from Indian cotton

A dressing gown, housecoat or morning gown is a robe, a loose-fitting outer garment, worn by either men or women. They are similar to a bathrobe but without the absorbent material.

A dressing gown or a housecoat is a loose, open-fronted gown closed with a fabric belt that is put on over nightwear on rising from bed, or, less commonly today, worn over some day clothes when partially dressed or undressed in the morning or evening (for example, over a man's shirt and trousers without jacket and tie).

Dressing gowns are typically worn around the house. They may be worn for warmth, over nightwear when not in bed, or as a form of lingerie. A dressing gown may be worn over nightwear or other clothing, or with nothing underneath. When guests or other visitors enter the household while the host(s) are partially dressed or undressed, a dressing gown may be used for modesty.

== History ==
The regular wearing of a dressing gown by men about the house is derived from the 18th-century wearing of the banyan in orientalist imitation. The gowns were frequently made out of fabrics such as printed cotton, silk damask, or velvet and were mainly worn by upper class men. By the mid-19th century, dressing gowns were used equally by both men and women as at-home wear. This gave men the opportunity to add color to their somber everyday wardrobe. For women, wearing a dressing gown was a break from tight corsets and layers of petticoats. Ladies wore their dressing gowns while eating breakfast, preparing for the day, sewing or having tea with their family.

Dressing gowns continued to be worn into the 20th century with similar garments like hostess dresses, robes, and peignoirs being used. By the end of the 20th century dressing gowns began seeing less frequent usage and fell out of fashion within the United States, as wearing such garments became increasingly associated with idleness and lethargy. However, this is in stark contrast to the United Kingdom where they are still in common use today.

The Japanese yukata is an unlined cotton kimono worn as a bathrobe or as summer outdoor clothing.
