= Pajamas =

Soft clothing originated from the Indian subcontinent

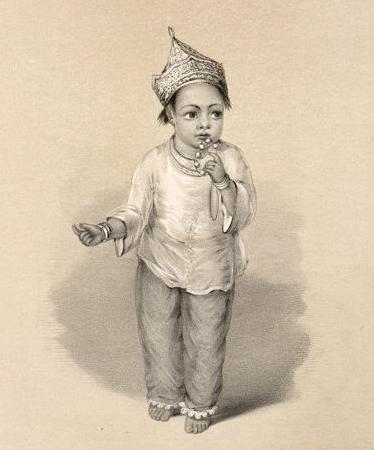
A Muslim girl in India wearing pajamas and kurti (lithograph from Emily Eden's Portraits of the Princes and People of India, 1844)

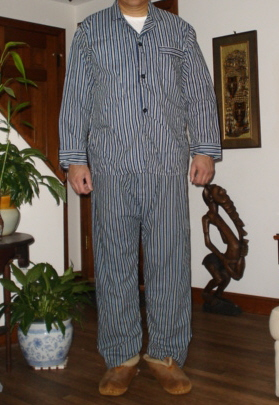
Two-piece men's pajamas

Pajamas (American English) or pyjamas (Commonwealth English), (Note: Pronounced variously as /pəˈdʒɑːməz, pɪ-, -ˈdʒæ-/ pə-JAH-məz, pih-, -JAM-əz.) sometimes colloquially shortened to PJs, jammies, jim-jams, or in South Asia, night suits, are several related types of clothing worn as nightwear or while lounging. Pajamas are soft garments derived from the Indian and Iranian bottom-wear, the pyjamas, which were adopted in the Western world as nightwear.

== Etymology ==
According to the Oxford English Dictionary, the word pyjama is a borrowing via Hindustani from Persian. Its etymology is:

Urdu pāy-jāma, pā-jāma and its etymon Persian pāy-jāma, pā-jāma, singular noun < Persian pāy, pā foot, leg + jāma clothing, garment (see jama n.1) + English -s, plural ending, after drawers.

OED's earliest evidence for pyjamas is from 1801, in the Asiatic Journal and Monthly Register for British India and Its Dependencies 1800.

== History ==
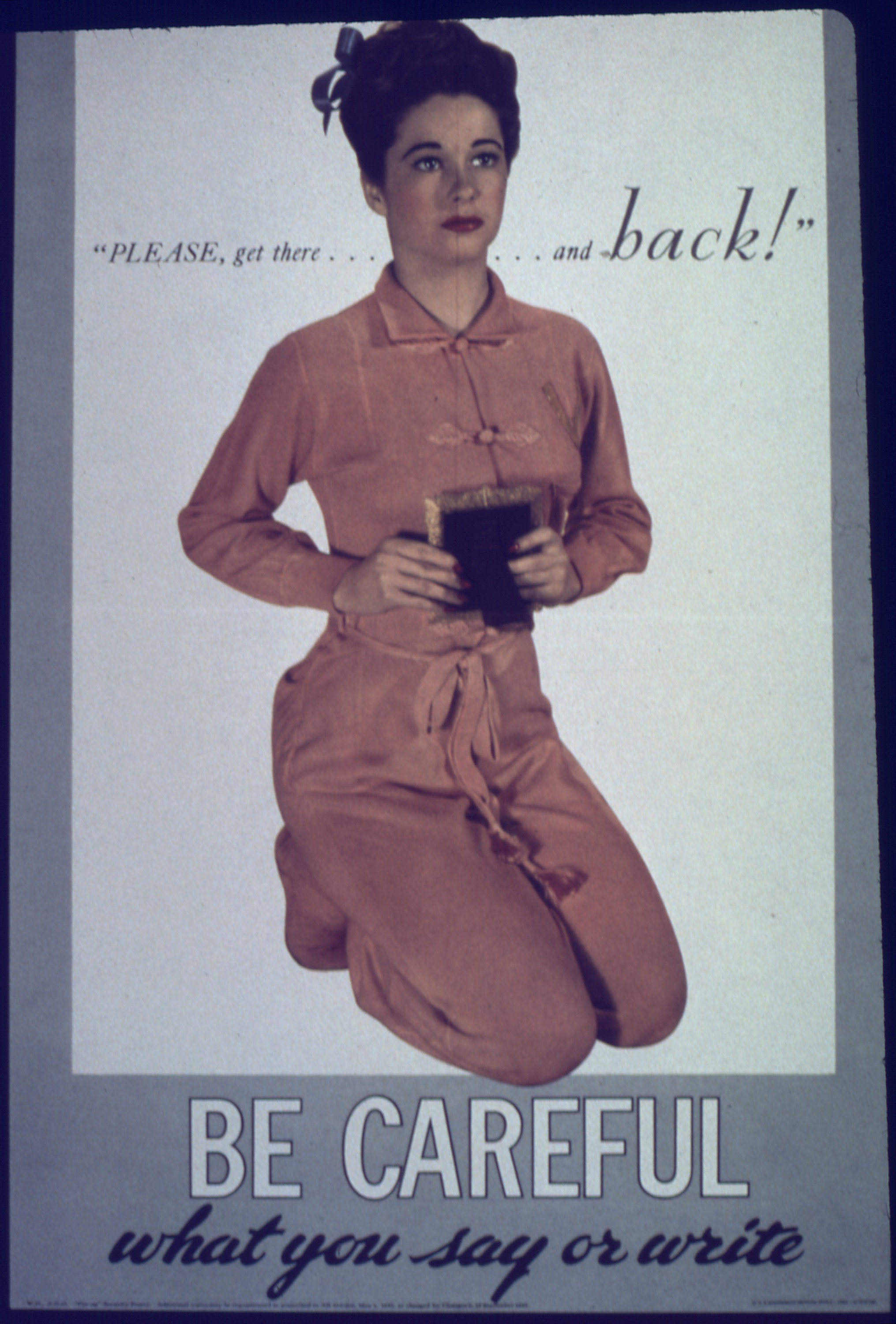
US government advert during World War II, female nightwear

The worldwide use of pyjamas (the word and the clothing) outside the Indian subcontinent is the result of adoption by British colonists and soldiers in the Indian subcontinent in the 18th and 19th centuries, and the British influence on the wider Western world during the Victorian era.

Pyjamas had been introduced to England as "lounging attire" as early as the seventeenth century, then known as mogul's breeches (Beaumont and Fletcher) but they soon fell out of fashion. The word pyjama (as pai jamahs, Paee-jams and variants) is recorded in English use in the first half of the nineteenth century. They did not become a fashion in Britain and the Western world as sleeping attire for men until the Victorian period, from about 1870.

Hobson-Jobson: A Glossary of Colloquial Anglo-Indian Words and Phrases (1886) summarizes the state of usage at the time (s.v. "pyjammas"):

Such a garment is used by various persons in India e.g. by women of various classes, by Sikh men, and most by Mohammedans of both sexes. It was adopted from the Mohammedans by Europeans as an article of dishabille [highly casual clothing] and of night attire, and is synonymous with Long Drawers, Shulwaurs, and Mogul-Breeches [...] It is probable that we English took the habit like a good many others from the Portuguese. Thus Pyrard (c. 1521) says, in speaking of Goa Hospital: "Ils ont force caleçon sans quoy ne couchent iamais les Portugais des Indes" [fr., "They have plenty of the undergarments without which the Portuguese in India never sleep"] [...] The word is now used in London shops. A friend furnishes the following reminiscence: "The late Mr. B—, tailor in Jermyn Street, some on 12 years ago, in reply to a question why pyjammas had feet sewn on to them (as was sometimes the case with those furnished by London outfitters) answered: "I believe, Sir, it is because of the White Ants."

== Types ==
=== Traditional ===
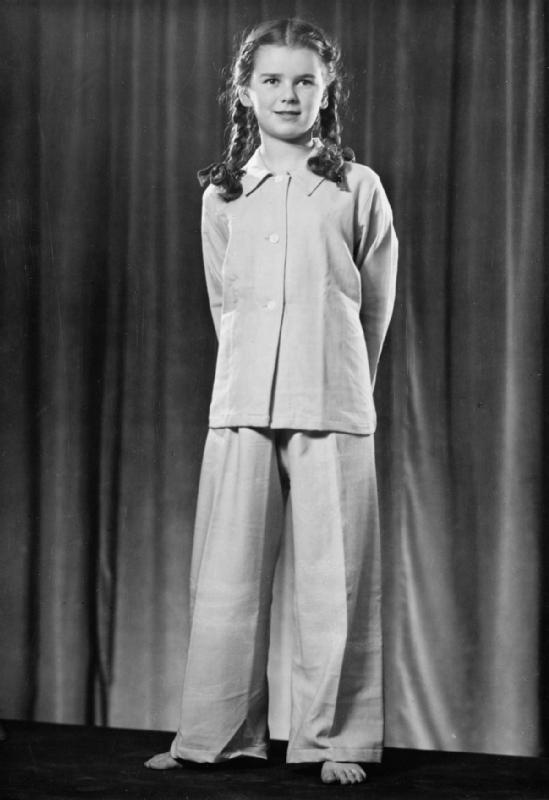
British Utility Underwear Clothing Restrictions on the British Home Front, 1942. 11 year old girl wearing wool pajamas as nightwear.

Traditional pajamas consist of a shirt-and-trousers combination made of soft fabric, such as flannel or lightweight silk. The shirt element usually has a placket front and sleeves with no cuffs.

Pajamas are usually worn as nightwear with bare feet, and can be worn with or without undergarments. They are also worn for comfort by people in their homes.

=== Contemporary ===
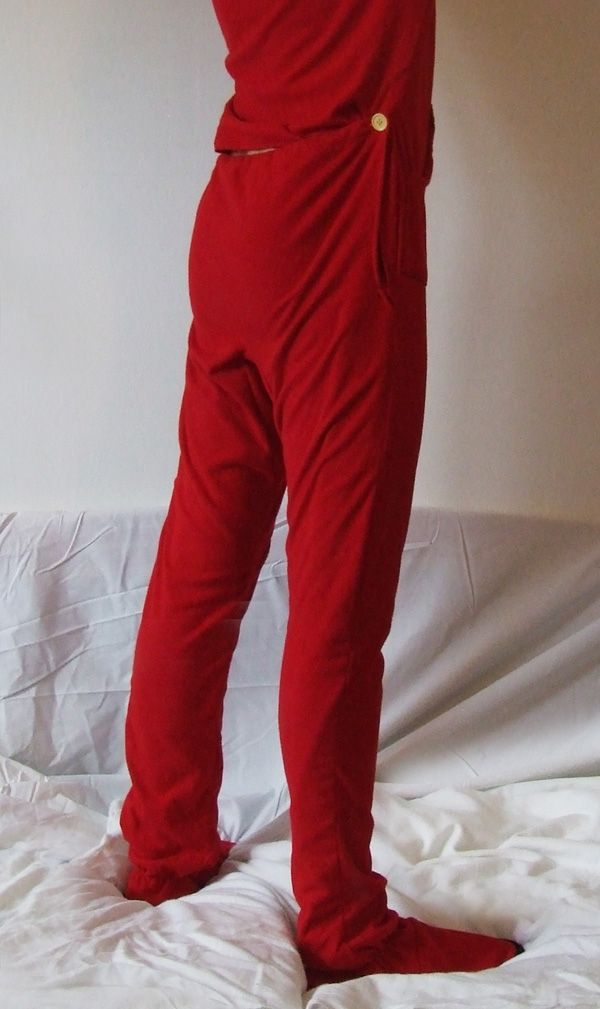
Pajamas with a drop seat

Contemporary pajamas are derived from traditional pajamas. There are many variations in style such as short sleeve pajamas, pajama bottoms of varying length, and pajamas incorporating various non-traditional materials. Often, people of both sexes opt to sleep or lounge in just pajama pants, usually with a t-shirt. For this reason, pajama pants are often sold as separates. Stretch-knit sleep apparel with rib-knit trimmings are common, mostly with young children.

Although pajamas are usually distinguished from one-piece sleeping garments such as nightgowns, in the US, they have sometimes included the latter or a somewhat shorter nightshirt as a top. Some pajamas, especially those designed for infants and toddlers, feature a drop seat (also known as a trap door or butt flap): a buttoned opening in the seat, designed to allow the wearer conveniently to use a toilet.

== Fire safety ==
In the United States, pajamas for children are required to comply with fire safety regulations. If made of flammable fabric, such as cotton, they must be tight fitting. Loose-fitting pajamas must be treated with a fire retardant. Regulations in the United Kingdom are less stringent; pajamas which do not comply with fire safety standards may be sold, but must be labelled "KEEP AWAY FROM FIRE".

== Society and culture ==
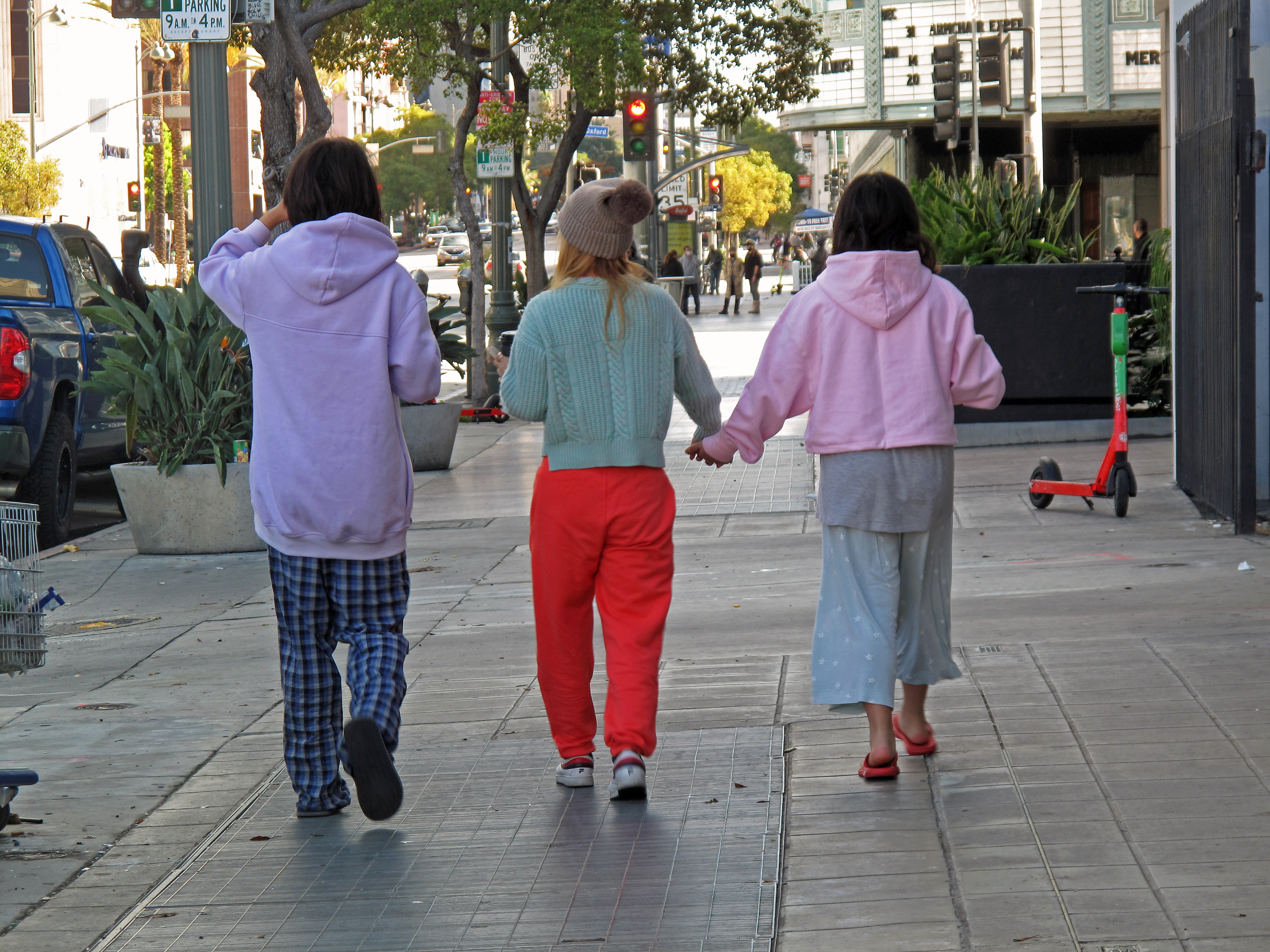
People wearing pajamas on Wilshire Boulevard, Los Angeles, on a Sunday morning

Pajamas in the Western world have been regarded as essentially indoors wear, or wear for the home, whether treated as daywear or nightwear. In movies and television, characters are often depicted wearing pajamas in bed, as a more proper alternative to other forms of nightwear such as underwear.

A 2016 article in the Phoenix New Times relates that "When the actress Bette Davis turned up in her 1942 [sic] film Old Acquaintance sporting her beau's pajama top as a nightie, it caused a fashion revolution: I. Magnin clothing buyer Bertie Strausser told The New York Times that she sold out of men's sleepwear the morning after the movie opened, and all of it to young women."

Since the late 18th century some people, in particular those in the US and to some extent Britain, Ireland, Australia, and New Zealand, have worn pajamas in public for convenience or as a fashion statement. One reason for the increased wearing of pajamas in public is that people no longer face the same social pressure as in the past. Sometimes pajamas are also worn in public for special occasions, such as schools which designate a "pajama day" where students and staff come to school in their pajamas to boost school spirit.

In response to this, organisations around the world have introduced measures to stop people wearing pajamas:

- In January 1976, the gulf emirate Ras Al Khaimah, UAE introduced a strict dress code for all local government workers forbidding them from wearing pajamas to work.
- In May 2010, Shanghai discouraged the wearing of pajamas in public during Expo 2010.
- In January 2012, a local Dublin branch of the Government's Department of Social Protection advised that pajamas were not regarded as appropriate attire for clients attending the office for welfare services.
- In January 2016, the Tesco supermarket in St Mellons, Cardiff, United Kingdom, started a ban on customers wearing pajamas.
- In 2020, due to the COVID-19 pandemic, an Illinois school district set remote learning guidelines which state that pajamas should not be worn while studying remotely and students should follow the same dress code as they normally would at school.

== Gallery ==
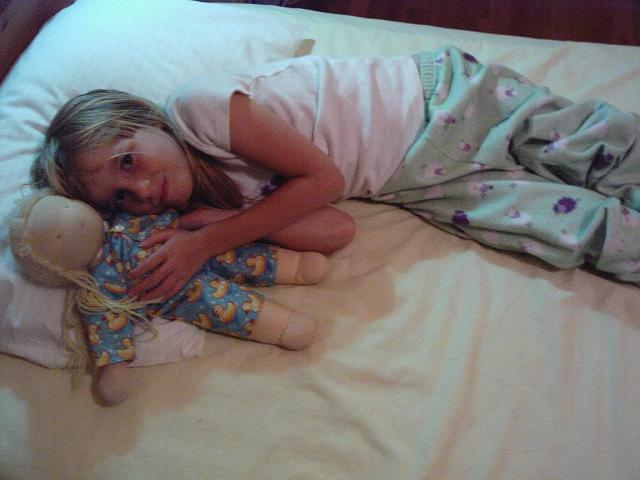
Girl in short-sleeve pajamas, doll in traditional.

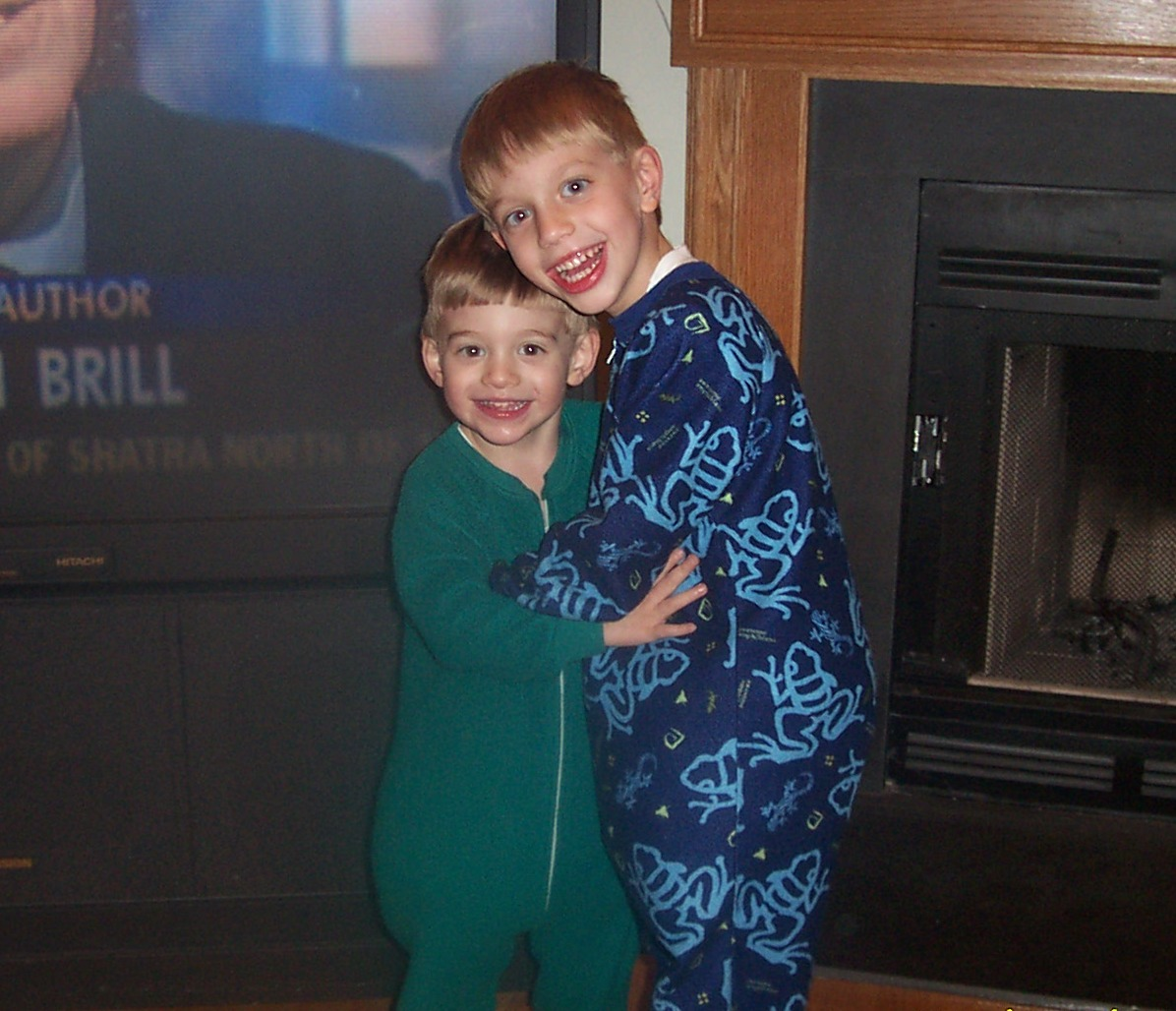
Boys in stretch-knit pajamas.

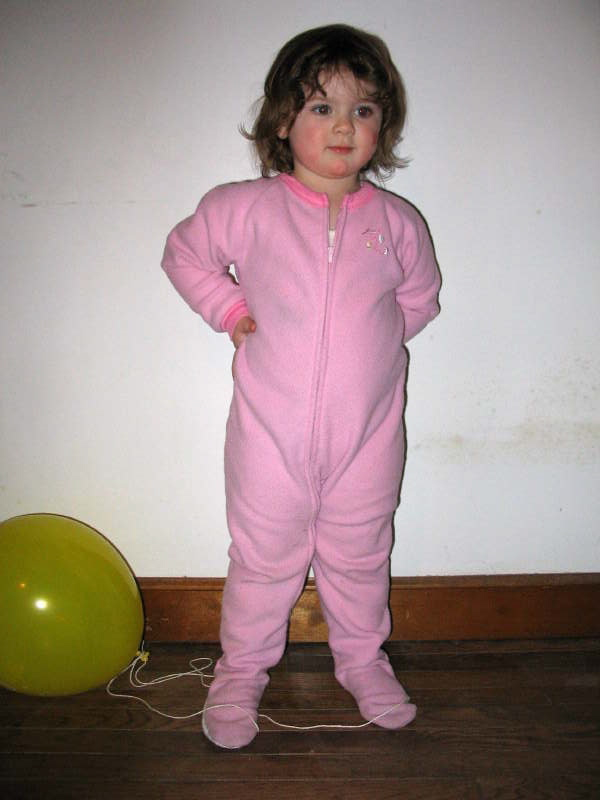
Toddler in footed pajamas.

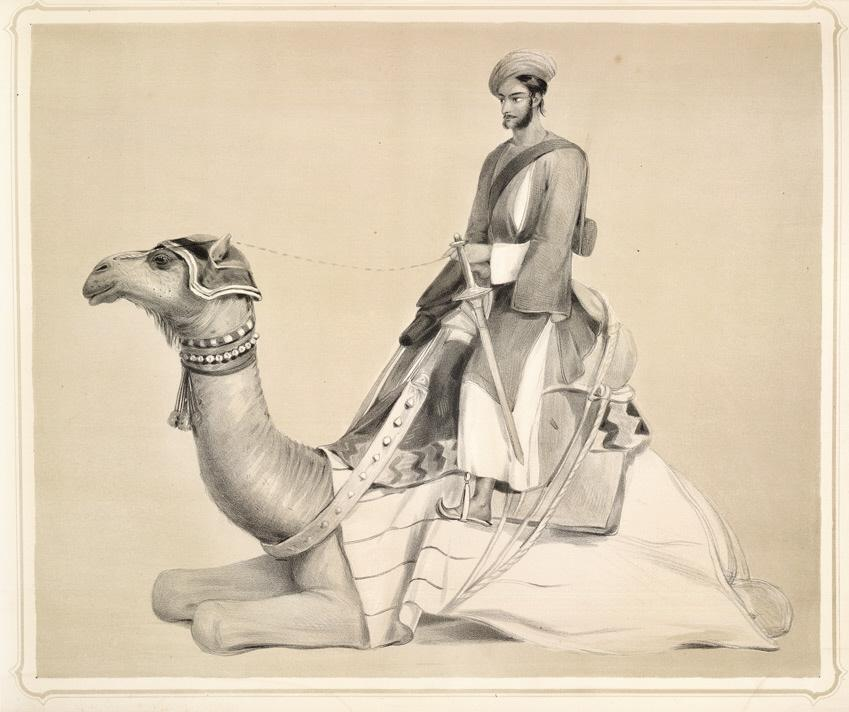
Courier in white pajamas, India, 1844.

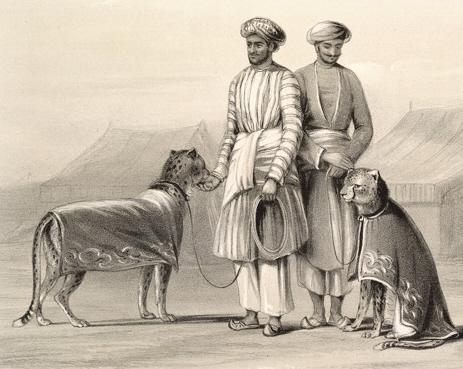
Men in white pajamas with hunting cheetahs, India 1844.

Muslim men in pajamas (various styles), Bombay, 1867

Muslim woman, in Sind, India, in salwar-style pajamas, 1870.

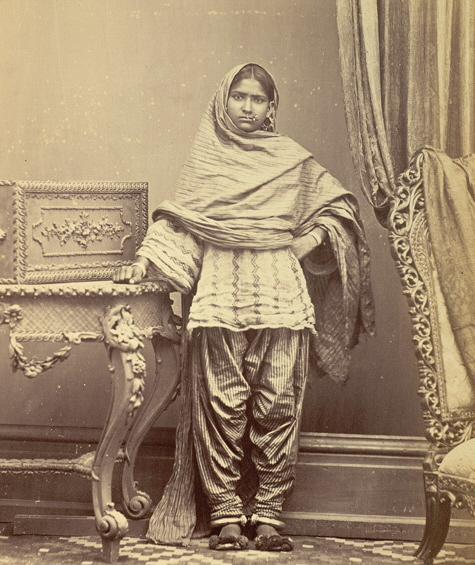
Hindu woman, in Sind, India, in shalwar-style pajamas, 1870.

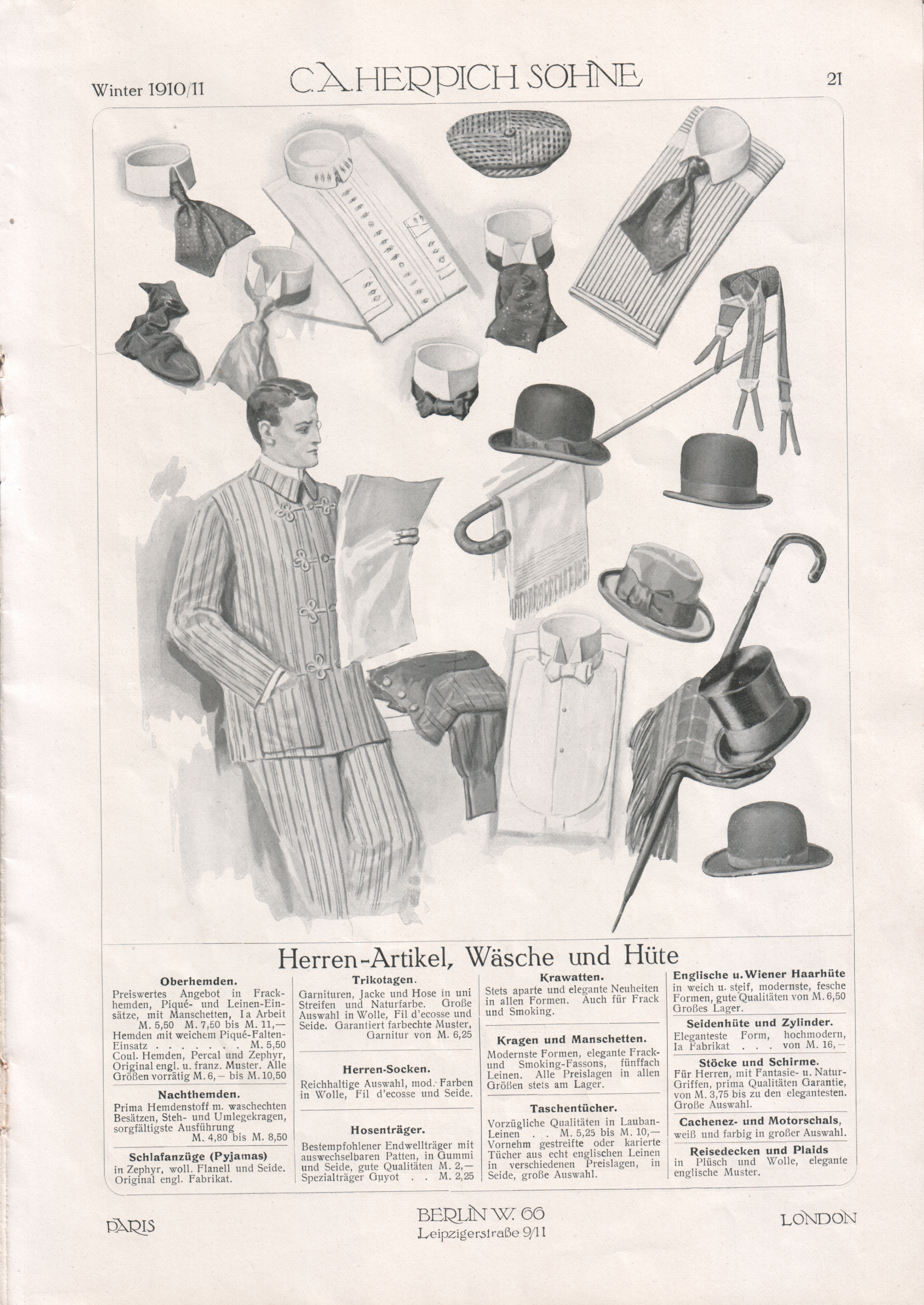
German advert with genuine English "Schlafanzüge (Pyjamas)", 1910

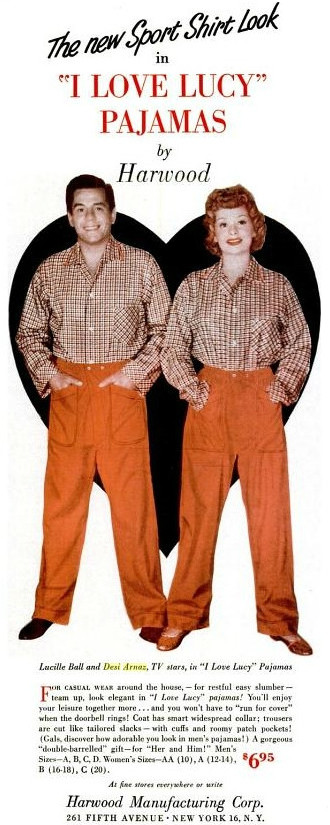
1953 American advert for his and hers day pajamas, I Love Lucy-style

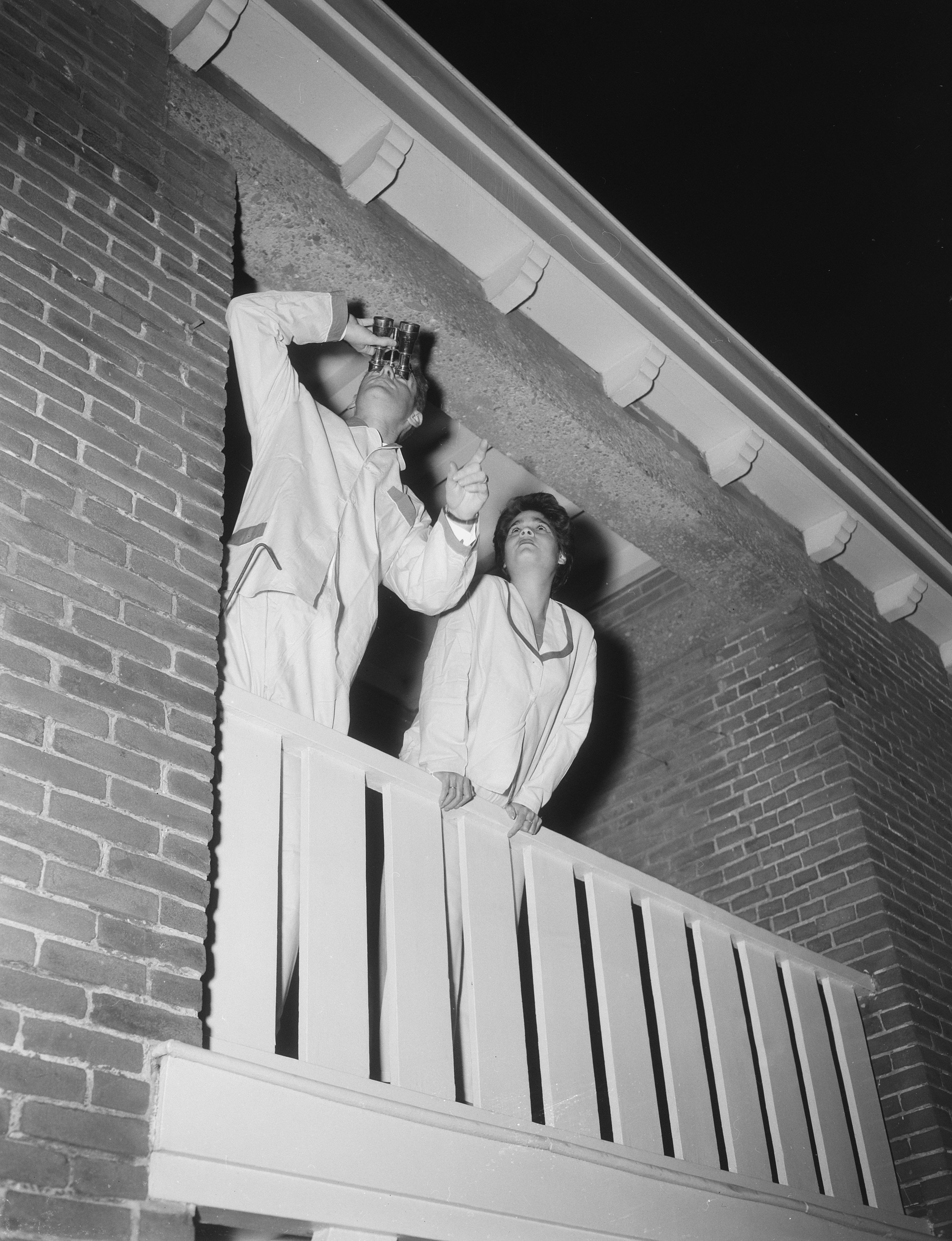
A Dutch couple viewing Sputnik 1, 1957

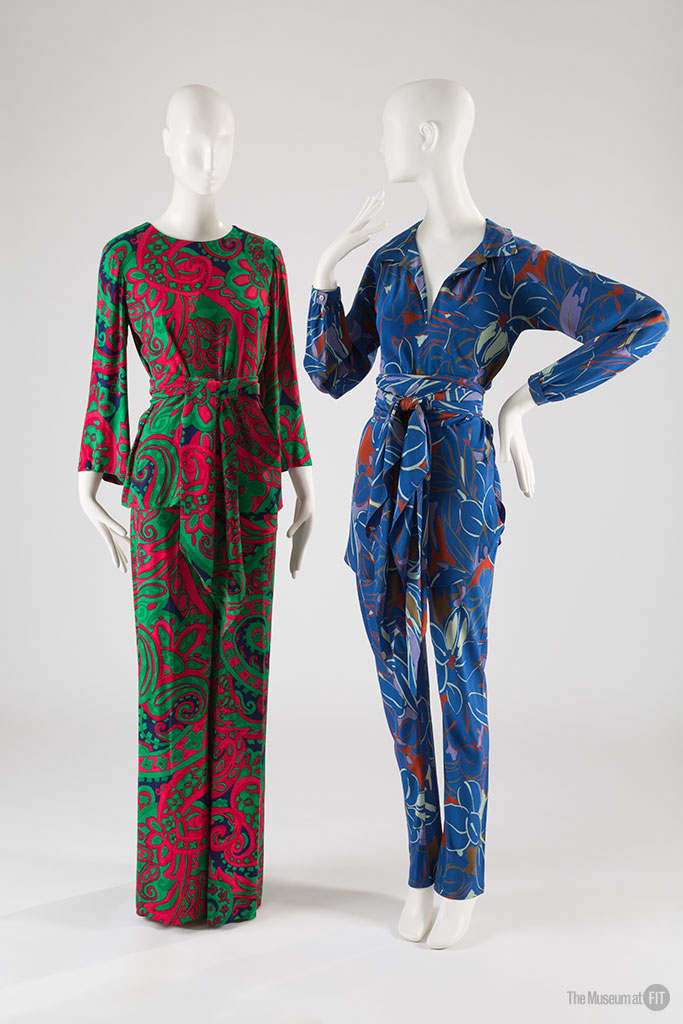
Yves Saint Laurent Rive Gauche, c. 1970 (left), Halston, c. 1976 (right)

== See also ==
- Bananas in Pyjamas
- Blanket sleeper
- Sleepover
- Nightgown
- Sleep
