= Peignoir =

Long, usually thin, woman's garment worn as a dressing gown

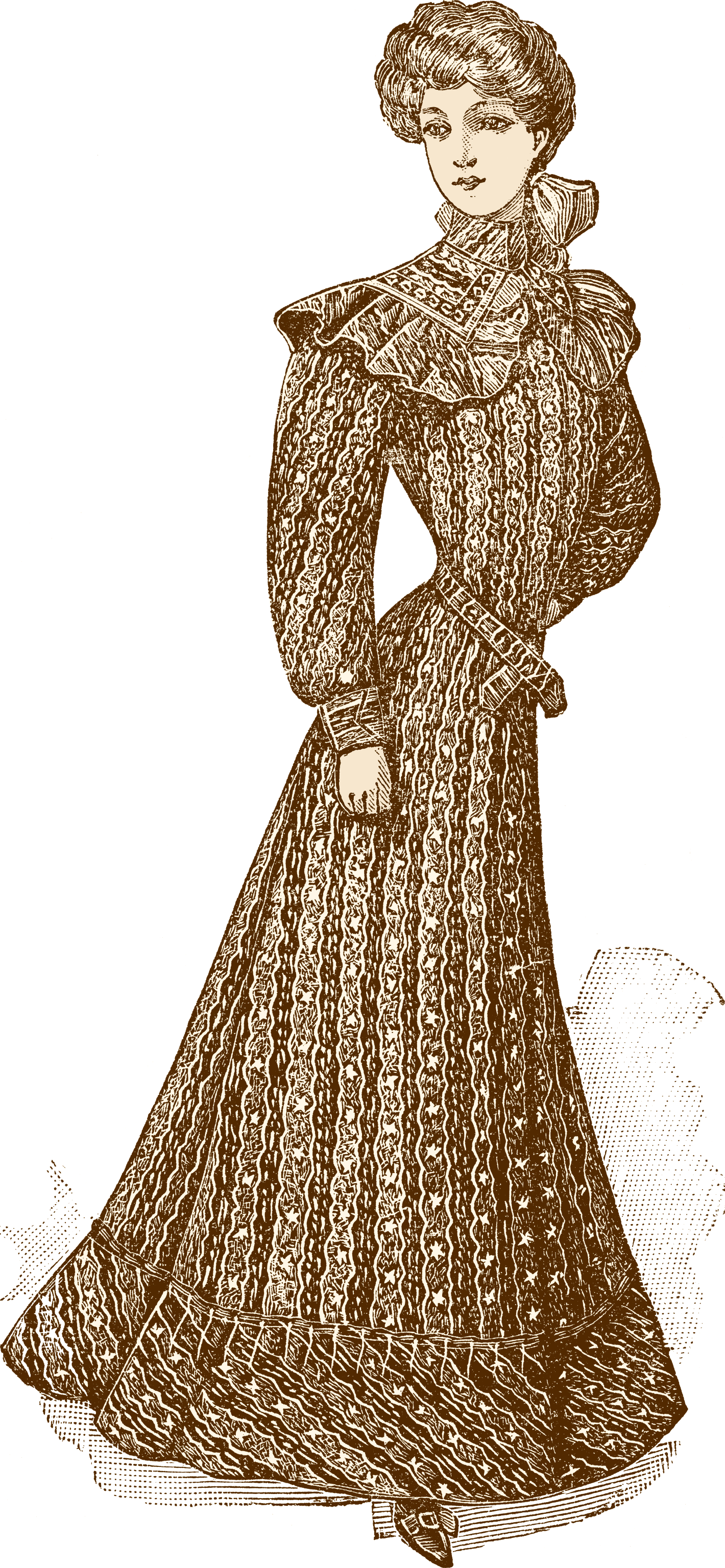
A peignoir c. 1906

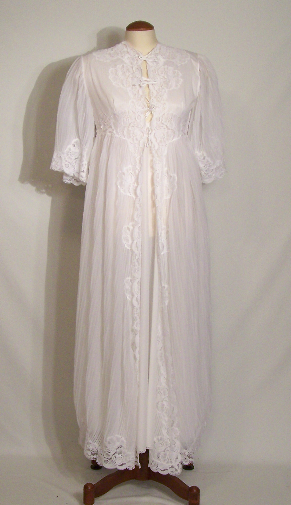
A 3-piece peignoir set of nylon and chiffon c. 1960s

A peignoir (/ˈpɛnwɑːr, ˈpeɪnwɑːr/ PEN-war, PAY-nwar, US also /pɛˈnwɑːr, peɪˈnwɑːr/ pen-WAR, pay-NWAR, French: [pɛɲwaʁ]) is a long outer garment for women which is frequently sheer and made of chiffon or another translucent fabric. The word comes from French peigner 'to comb [hair]' (from Latin pectināre, from pecten 'comb') describing a garment worn while brushing one's hair, originally referring to a dressing gown, bathrobe or lounging robe.

Very high-end peignoirs were occasionally sold with sheer long gloves and stockings made of the same material as the peignoir itself for wear to bed or on occasions where the wearer would be seen in her nightclothes, such as visiting or while sharing accommodations during travel during the mid-19th to mid 20th centuries. Contemporary peignoirs are usually sold with matching nightgown or panties.
