= Bathrobe =

Loose, informal garment worn after bathing or at home

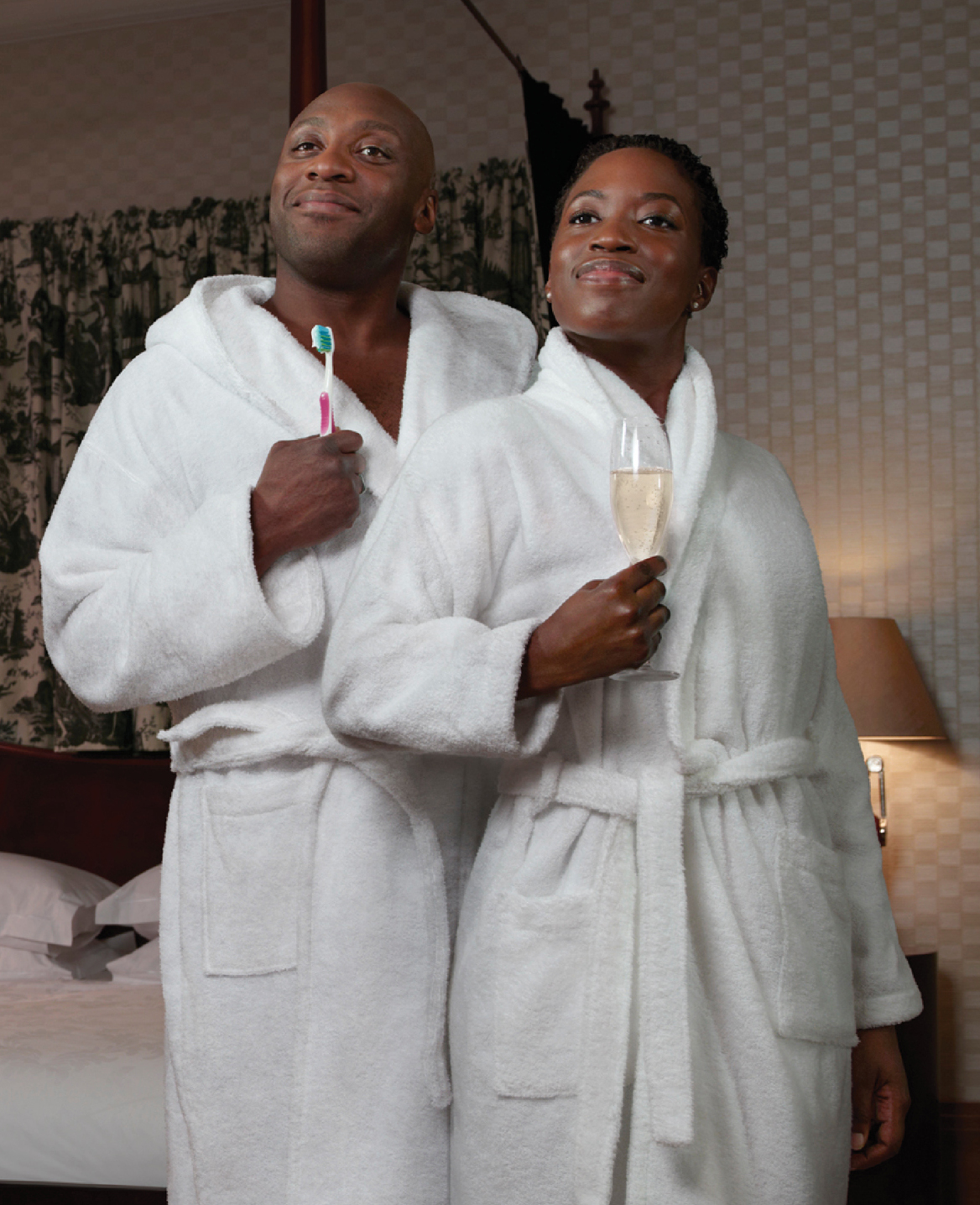
Two people wearing bathrobes

A bathrobe is a loose-fitting outer garment (a robe) worn by people, often after washing the body or around a pool. A bathrobe is considered to be very informal clothing, and is not worn with everyday clothes.

A bathrobe is a dressing gown made from towelling or other absorbent fabric and may be donned while the wearer's body is wet, serving both as a towel and a body covering when there is no immediate need to fully dress.

== Fabrics and fibre types ==
=== Fabrics ===
Bathrobes can be categorized by the weave of their fabric:

- Flannel: Flannel is a soft woven fabric, made from loosely spun yarn, usually cotton or wool.
- Terrycloth: Terrycloth is a pile fabric, usually woven of cotton, with uncut loops on both sides, used for bath towels and robes. The longer and denser the loops are, the more absorbent the bathrobes are.
- Velour: Velour is a pile fabric where the loops woven into the fabric have been cut. Velour bathrobes are typically made with a terrycloth lining, as terrycloth absorbs water better than velour. Velour can make a bathrobe appear more luxurious, cosier, and makes the garment soft to the touch.
- Waffle fabric: Waffle fabric has good water absorbency, with a lightweight weave and a distinctive "gridlike" appearance. These bathrobes are designed for their light weight over their absorbency.

Bathrobes and bathrobe fabrics can also be categorised for their fibre types, and are generally made of four different fibres:

- Cotton: Cotton is a natural fibre consisting primarily of cellulose and is one of the most commonly used fibres in textile manufacturing. Due to the hydrophilic nature of cellulose, cotton absorbs water easily and is frequently used by the beach, pool, or following a shower. Cotton robes are especially suited to use in hot climates because cotton tends to absorb perspiration.
- Silk: Silk dressing gowns are popular because of their look and feel, but can be relatively expensive. Silk robes are very thin and lightweight, and are not particularly suited to wet situations because they lack the surface area and polarity necessary to absorb water. However, silk dressing gowns are the traditional choice, since they are not worn after bathing.
- Microfiber: Microfiber is an extremely fine synthetic fiber, typically made of cellulose or polyester, that can be woven into textiles to mimic natural-fiber cloth. Modern microfibers are developed to maximize breathability and water absorption and can be thinner than the width of human hair. Much like silk, robes made out of microfiber are light in weight and are very soft to the touch. Microfiber is flammable.
- Wool: Wool bathrobes are common in colder climates.
- Nylon: Nylon is a synthetic fibre occasionally used in inexpensive dressing gowns. It is valued for its ability to be cleaned easily.

== Design and construction ==
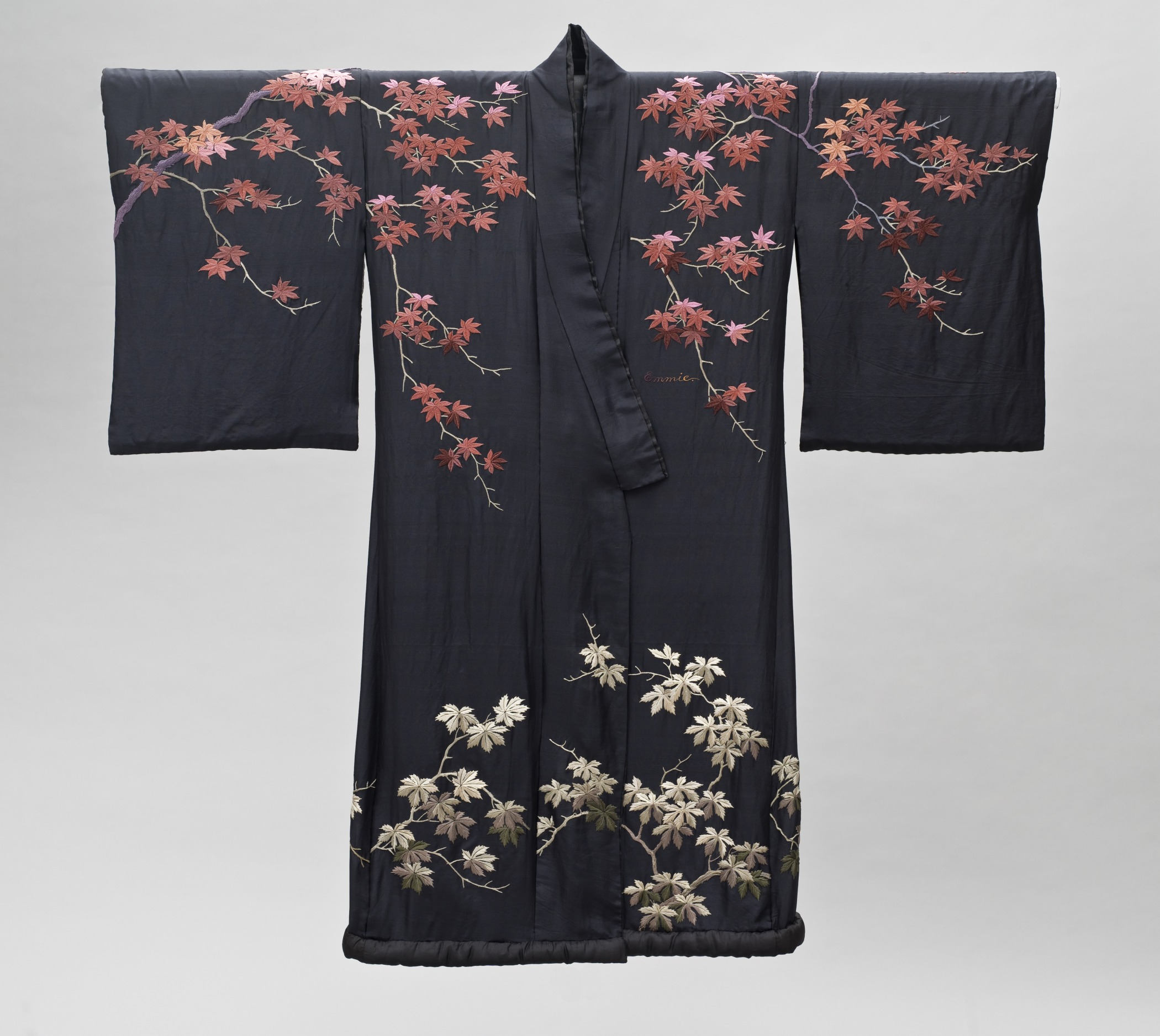
Woman's kimono-style dressing gown with a sash, made in Japan for the Western market, late 19th-early 20th century

Most bathrobes are designed as a wrapped-front garment with belt loops and a matching belt, intended to be tied around the waist to hold the garment closed.

However, bathrobe designs vary, typically in collar and closure design, with some garments featuring an open front or fastened closures in place of a belt. Varieties of collar design include:

- Shawl collar: So-called because the collar closes around the neck like a shawl. The shawl collar is borrowed from its use on men's evening wear on the dinner jacket and smoking jacket, and is common on traditional dressing gowns.
- Kimono collar: Similar to the collar found on the kimono, a traditional Japanese garment, the collar forms a thin strip of consistent width, wrapping around the front in a Y-shaped manner.
- Hooded: A hood is sewn into the neckline, which can be worn over the head to keep it warm and help to dry wet hair.

== See also ==
- Dressing gown
- Khalat
- Negligee
- Toga
- Banyan (clothing)
