= Nightshirt =

Shirt worn at night to sleep in

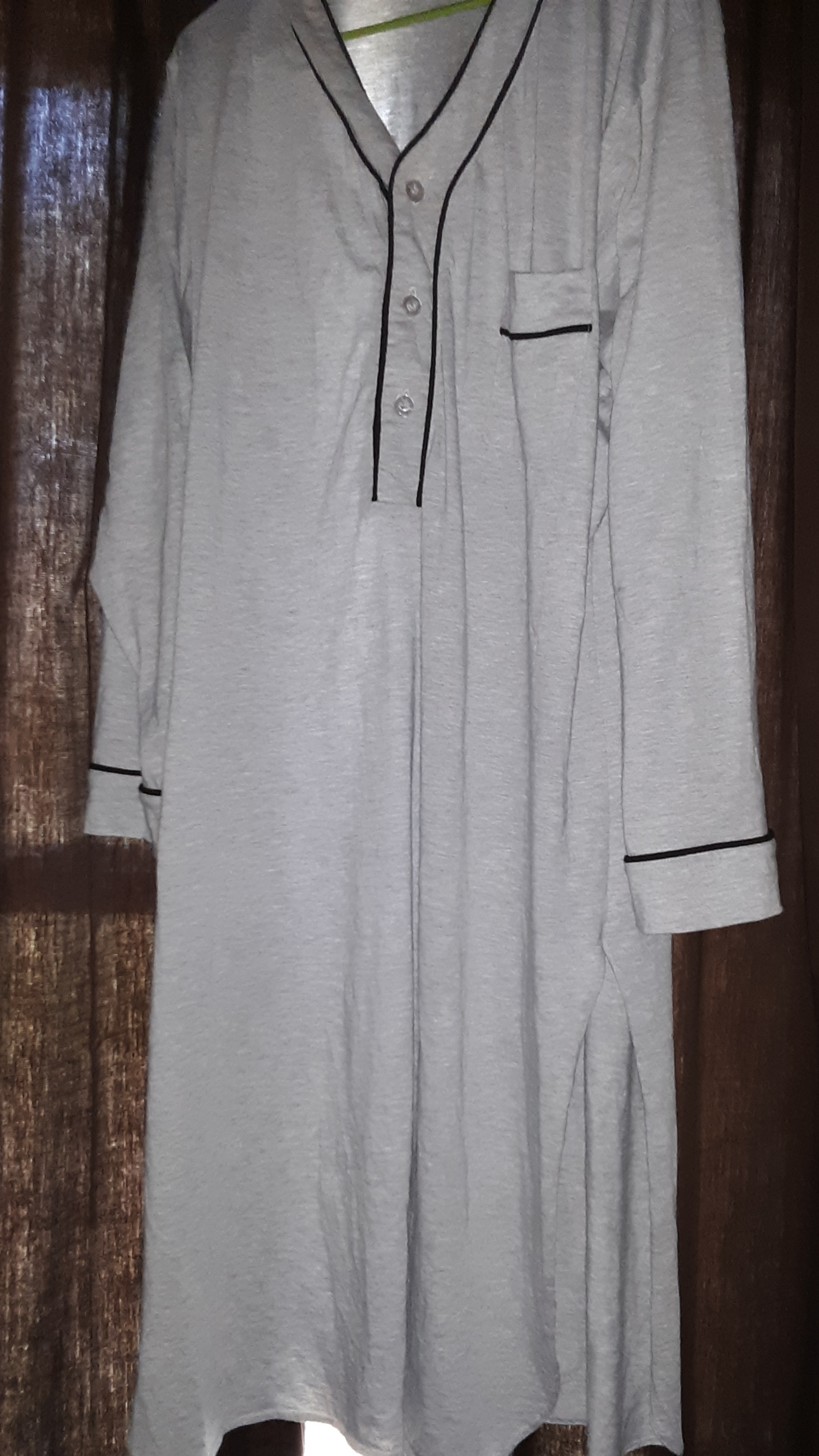
A modern men's nightshirt

A nightshirt is a garment intended for wear while sleeping, often with a nightcap. It is longer than most regular shirts, reaching down below the knees, leaving some of the legs uncovered. It is often referred to as a nightgown for men, but nowadays, nightshirts are an optional sleepwear for women too.

In the US, it also sometimes means a shirt, slightly longer than a regular shirt, reaching down to the thighs, worn as loungewear and nightwear. Traditional nightshirts are used just for nightwear, removed and stored away for next use upon waking. This other, non-traditional type is worn with pajama bottoms.

Until the 16th century men slept naked or in a day-shirt. Nobles in the 16th century then wore embroidered shirts or "wrought night-shirts". By the 19th century the nightshirt resembled a day-shirt with a loose, turned-down collar and similar length to a nightgown. Historically, nightshirts were often made of ruined or very cheap fabric, but most are now made of normal cloth.

Like nightgowns, it is recommended to wear a robe or a dressing gown over them when expecting guests.

== See also ==
- Nightcap
- Nightgown
