= Negligee =

Sheer or heavily trimmed woman's nightgown or dressing gown

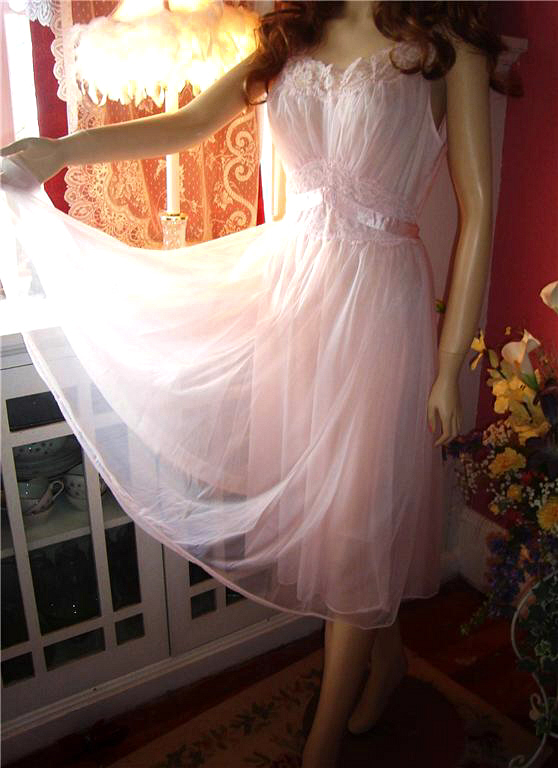
A négligée on a mannequin.

The negligee or négligée (French: négligé [negliʒe]; lit. 'neglected'), also known in French as déshabillé ([dezabije]; lit. 'undressed'), is a form of see-through clothing for women consisting of a sheer, usually long, dressing gown. It is a form of nightgown intended to be worn in the bedroom. It was introduced in France in the 18th century, where it mimicked the heavy head-to-toe style of women's day dresses of the time.

By the 1920s, the negligee began to mimic women's satin single-layer evening dress of the period. The term "negligee" was used on a Royal Doulton run of ceramic figurines in 1927, showing women wearing what appears to be a one-piece knee-length slip made of silk or rayon, trimmed with lace. Although the evening-dress style of nightwear made moves towards the modern negligee style—translucent bodices, lace trimming, bows, exemplified in 1941 by a photo of Rita Hayworth in Life—it was only after World War II that nightwear changed from being primarily utilitarian to being primarily sensual or even erotic; the negligee emerged strongly as a form of lingerie.

Modern negligees are often much looser, made of sheer and diaphanous fabrics, and trimmed with lace or other fine material and bows. Multiple layers of fabric are often used. The modern negligee thus perhaps owes more to women's fine bedjackets or bed-capes, and up-market slips than to the nightgown. It spread to a mass market, benefiting from the introduction of cheap synthetic fabrics such as nylon and its finer successors. From the 1940s to the 1970s, the trend was for negligees to become shorter in length (e.g. the babydoll of the 1970s). Negligees made from the 1940s to the 1970s are now collectible vintage items.

In the UK in 2004, negligees accounted for only four percent of women's nightwear sales, women's pyjamas having dominated since the mid-1980s. However, UK negligee sales are said to have been the fastest increasing sector of the market since 1998.
