= List of garments having different names in American and British English =

List of garments having different names in American and British English.

Image	Description	British English	American English
	Longsleeve knit top	jumper	sweater
	Sleeveless knit top	sleeveless jumper, slipover, knit tank top	sweater vest
	Sleeveless dress worn over a shirt	Pinafore, pinny, pinafore dress	Jumper, jumper dress, dress
	Old-fashioned style of apron	Pinafore apron	Pinafore, pinafore apron
	Sleeveless padded garment used as outerwear	Gilet, body warmer	Vest, puffer vest
	Sleeveless garment used as outerwear	Waistcoat	Vest, tailored vest
	Sleeveless garment used as underwear	Vest	Wifebeater, undershirt
	Sleeveless, legless, one piece infant garment with snap or other type of closure	Vest, bodysuit	onesie, sleeveless bodysuit, bodysuit
	Short sleeve, legless, one piece infant garment with snap or other closure	bodysuit	onesie, bodysuit
	One-piece loungewear garment worn by children and adults	onesie	one-piece, jumpsuit, long johns
	Long sleeve and long legs one-piece garment for babies worn as sleep and everyday wear	babygrow, sleepsuit, babygro	sleeper, one-piece, pajamas, sleep and play
	Longsleeve or short sleeve one-piece outfit worn as everyday wear	boilersuit, overalls	Jumpsuit (everyday wear), coveralls (workwear)
	Sleeveless one-piece outfit worn over a shirt, with long legs	dungarees	overalls, bib overalls, farm overalls
	Long leg bottoms made out of thick sweatshirt fabric with elastic at the bottom	joggers, jogging bottoms, tracksuit bottoms	sweatpants, joggers
Track suit trousers	Long leg bottoms made out of any fabric with elastic at the bottom	joggers, jogging bottoms, tracksuit bottoms	joggers, pants
	Long leg bottoms	trousers, pants (Northern England only)	pants
	garment worn over genitals as underwear - gender specific term (women)	knickers	panties
	Garment worn over genitals as underwear - gender neutral term	pants, underwear, underpants	underwear, underpants
	Garment worn inside the home.	Dressing gown	Bathrobe, robe
