= Layette =

Set of clothing and equipment for infants

A layette is a collection of clothing and accessories for a newborn child. The term "layette set" is commonly used in the United States to refer to sets of baby clothes. In the 1920s, expectant mothers or their friends and relatives frequently knitted a matching layette set, consisting of a blanket, hat, sweater and booties. Expectant parents today are more likely to purchase pre-curated layette sets from brands.

Traditionally, women would often hand-sew or knit their baby's clothes during their pregnancy. Today "layette" is often used to identify a baby clothing section of a store. The term can also be used for bedding, accessories, and baby care items.

== Etymology ==
In English, the word is borrowed from French: layette, meaning a small box or coffer.

== Basic layette ==
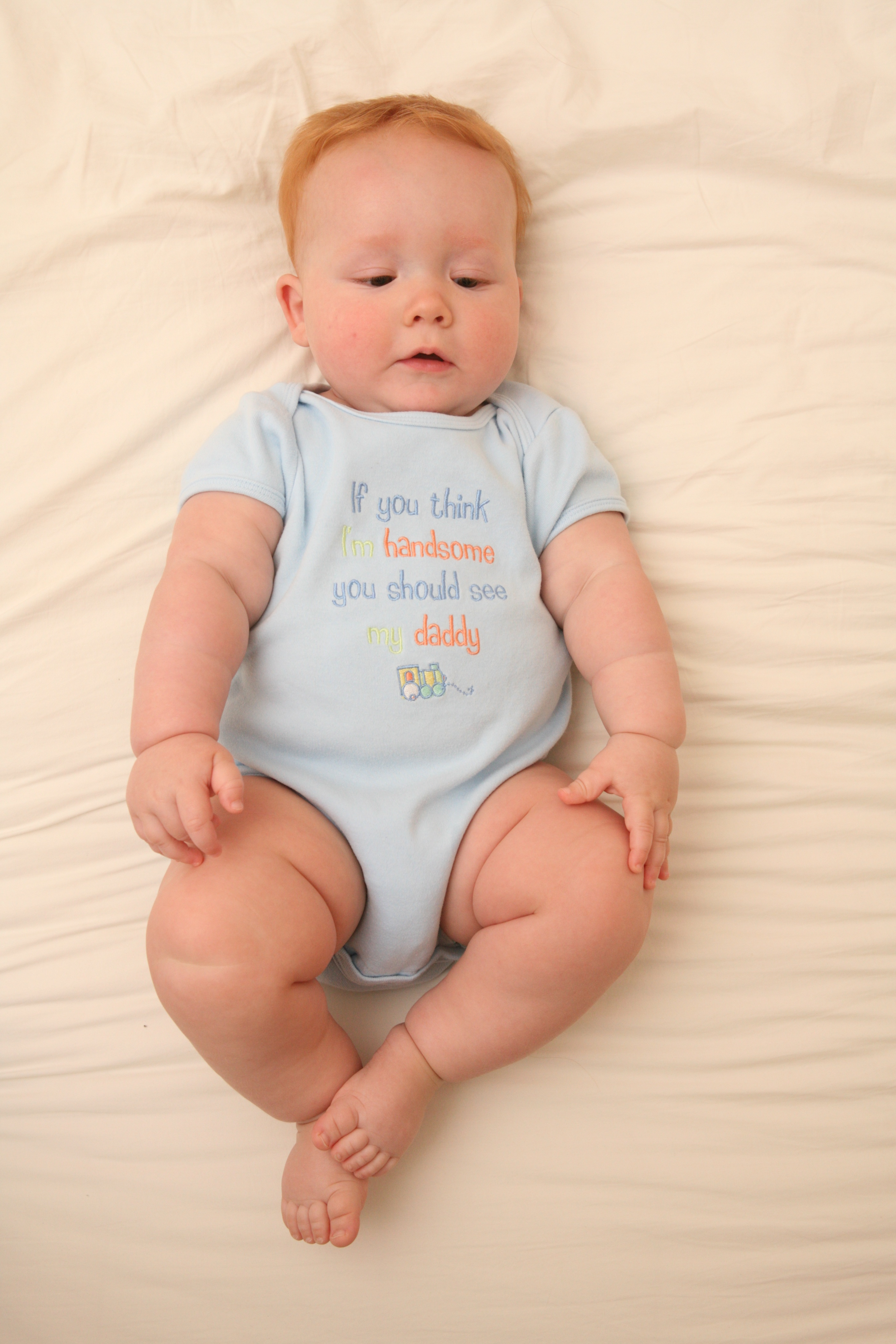
Infant wearing a onesie

Although there is no strict definition of the items included in a layette, basic layette items often include:

- a going-home-from-the-hospital (or birth center) outfit
- legless sleepwear (sleeping gowns/kimono/sleeping bags/newborn sacques/blanket sleepers) or footed sleepers
- onesies (short-sleeved, legless bodysuits)/all-in-ones/rompers/coveralls
- undershirts/T-shirts
- receiving blankets
- swaddling blankets
- hooded towels
- baby washcloths
- cloth diapers (nappies)
- socks/bootees
- hats/beanies/sweaters/bunting (depending on the climate)
- burp cloths (cloth diapers are often recommended)
- scratch mitts
- vests
- baby rattles
- teethers
- pacifiers (dummies)
- baby bottles

== See also ==
- Maternity package
