= Pram suit =

A pram suit is a one-piece item of clothing for infants, designed as cold-weather outerwear, and typically enclosing the entire body except for the face. Usual features include bifurcated legs with attached bootees, sleeves ending in removable hand covers, and an attached hood.

The name comes from the British term for a stroller, perambulator, shortened to pram. The suit is intended to keep a child warm, while riding in a stroller or a baby carriage.

== Related garments ==
- Blanket sleeper
- Infant bodysuit
- Infant clothing
- Snowsuit
