= Blanket sleeper =

One-piece, footed sleeping suit

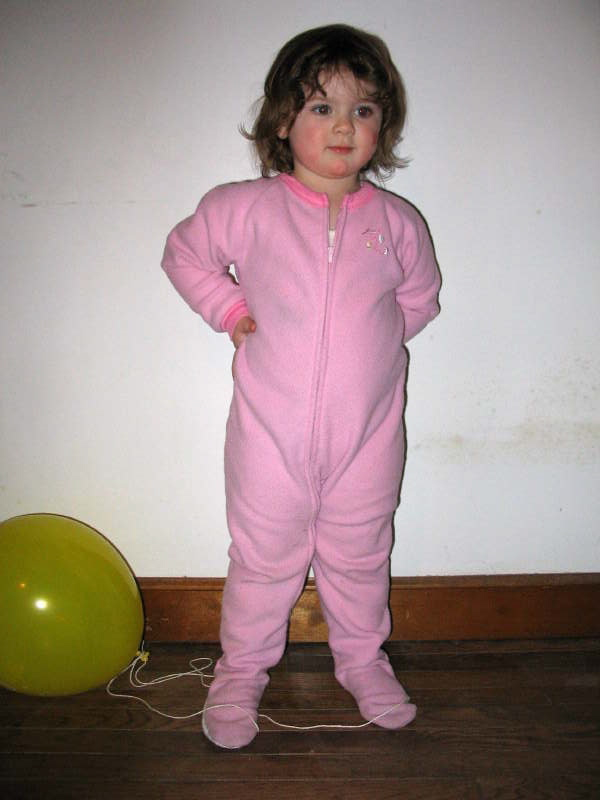
- A two-year-old wearing a blanket sleeper.
- Type: Nightwear

The blanket sleeper (also known by many other synonyms and trade names) is a type of especially warm sleeper or footie pajama worn primarily during the winter in the United States and Canada. The garment is worn especially by young children.

Typically, but not always, the blanket sleeper consists of a loose-fitting, one-piece garment of blanket-like material, usually fleece, enclosing the entire body except for the head and hands. It represents an intermediate step between regular pajamas or babygrow, and bag-like coverings for infants such as buntings or infant sleeping bags (Terminology and Variations sections below). Like bag-like coverings, the blanket sleeper is designed to be sufficiently warm as to make regular blankets or other bed covers unnecessary, even in colder weather. Unlike such coverings, the blanket sleeper has bifurcated legs to allow unhindered walking (or crawling).

While no single feature is universal (see Terminology), blanket sleepers usually include:

- One-piece construction with long sleeves and legs.
- Attached bootees enclosing the wearer's feet.
- Composition from relatively thick, heavy fabric.

Although any sleeping garment with some or all of these characteristics could be called a blanket sleeper, the term is most commonly applied to a range of styles that deviate relatively little from the same basic design. (The features of this design are described in the Features section, below).

== Features ==
Features of the typical blanket sleeper often include:

- Usually made of a napped synthetic fabric, such as polyester or polar fleece; however sleepers made from heavier natural fabrics such as cotton are also available, they are not common in North America due to stringent regulations regarding flammability.
- Loose fit. On smaller sizes, the hip area may be made especially loose to accommodate a diaper. The crotch is usually cut especially low.
- Raglan sleeves.
- Snug rib-knit collar and wrist cuffs.
- Usually made in one or more solid, bright colors, or screen-printed with graphic designs. There may be a front panel with a single, elaborate printed design, either covering the chest, or forming the entire front portion of the torso and legs. The sleeves may be a different color from the rest of the garment. Stripes are sometimes seen, most commonly on the collar and cuffs.
- Soles of the feet made from a (usually white) vinyl fabric lined with (synthetic) felt, for improved durability and slip-resistance. This can be solid vinyl with a rough textured surface, or a vinyl-dotted fabric such as Jiffy Grip.
- Optional toe caps, made from the same fabric as the soles of the feet, and covering the top front portion of the foot, for improved durability.
- Elastic to make the leg portions snug around the ankles.
- A zipper running vertically down the front of the garment, from the neck opening to the inside or front ankle of one of the legs (usually the left), designed to make it easy to put on and take off. On teen and adult sizes, the zipper usually instead runs from the neck to the crotch.
- Optional snap tab where the zipper meets the neck opening. This is a small tab of fabric sewed to the garment on one side of the zipper (usually the right), and fastening to the other side with a snap fastener, designed to prevent discomfort from the zipper slider coming into contact with the wearer's chin and deter access to the zipper.
- Optional decorative applique on one side of the chest (usually the left).
- Optional hood.
- Optional mittens/mitts (mainly on infant and costume sleepers).

Although primarily worn by the young, blanket sleepers are also worn (in decreasing order of frequency) by school-age children, teens, and even adults. (See Sizes, gender differences, and availability, below).

Although footed, one-piece garments in a variety of fabrics and styles are used in many countries as infant sleepwear, the specific range of styles with which the term blanket sleeper is usually associated, the term itself, though children older than infancy wearing footed, one-piece sleeping garments is concentrated in the Western world.

== Design considerations ==
Blanket sleepers are usually intended as practical garments, worn mostly by younger children and primarily in the home. Style and fashion thus tend not to be important in its design, and the basic design of the typical blanket sleeper has changed little over the years.

The sleeper serves mainly to keep the wearer warm at night, even in the absence of blankets and bed covers. The sleeper covers the entire body except for the head (except in certain cases where a hood is present) and (in most cases) hands (except in cases where a sleeper has attached mitts, mostly on infant sizes), where it is snug at the neck and wrists. The use of a zipper closure in place of buttons or snap fasteners also further retains warmth by eliminating drafts. This is especially important for infants, for whom loose blankets may pose a safety hazard (including increasing the risk of SIDS), and possibly for older children, who may still be too young to be relied upon to keep their own sleepwear or bed covers adjusted so as to prevent exposure to the air of bare skin. This is reflected in advertisements by blanket sleeper manufacturers, which often emphasize that their garments "can't be kicked off", or that "no other covers are needed". The permanently attached feet can also be a beneficial feature for children who are prone to get out of bed in the morning before their parents are awake, and are too young to be relied upon to put on slippers or other footwear to keep their feet warm, as well as for adults who find putting on, and/or wearing socks in bed too bothersome, yet still want their feet covered when getting out of bed in the morning. Blanket sleepers without feet allow more room for growth and reduce the possibility of slipping. Also, children with larger or smaller feet find a better fit.

The blanket sleeper is designed so that it can be worn either by itself as a standalone garment, or as a second layer worn over regular pajamas or other sleepwear. The one-piece design is simple to launder and has no detachable pieces that could be individually misplaced.

Yet another potential benefit of the blanket sleeper is that it may help prevent infants from removing or interfering with their diapers during the night. This can also apply to older children with certain developmental disabilities, such as Angelman syndrome. In particular, parents of Angelman children have been known to take such additional measures as cutting the feet off the sleeper and putting it on backwards, and/or covering the zipper with duct tape. Some specialty locking clothing and other adaptive clothing purveyors offer blanket sleepers, with or without feet, for adults with dementia or other disabilities, for similar reasons.

Blanket sleepers may also appeal to cultural mores relating to body modesty. This can, for example, be a consideration for some parents when siblings sleep in the same room and/or bed.

=== Materials ===
The range of materials used for mass-produced blanket sleepers for children is severely limited, as a result of stringent U.S. government-imposed flammability requirements. Essentially the only materials used since the 1950s are polyester, acrylic, and modacrylic, with polyester dominating. Unfortunately, this can have a negative impact on comfort for many wearers, particularly children with eczema. A small number of sleepers are made from cotton.

Adult-size sleepers, especially those sold by small Internet businesses, can be found in a wider range of materials, including natural fabrics such as cotton flannel. Some web businesses also offer sleepers in natural fabrics for children, but only outside the U.S. In particular, special eczema sleepsuits for children, made of cotton and with built-in mitts designed to prevent scratching, are available from specialty stores in the UK.

The fabrics used in most blanket sleepers have a strong tendency to pill. Although this does not adversely affect the garment's functional utility, it has the effect that a used garment can be clearly, visually distinguished from a new one after only a small number of wearings or washings.

Decorative features such as appliques or printed designs usually follow juvenile themes, and are designed to make the garments more attractive to the children who wear them. Some adult sleepers can also have appliques on them, but those tend to be from Internet clothing suppliers who offer custom-made sleepers and tend to be of favorite cartoon characters or items that the wearer had in childhood such as teddy bears and animal representatives that they had as pets.

== Sizes, gender differences, and availability ==
In the United States and Canada, mass-produced blanket sleepers for both boys and girls up to size 4 (see US standard clothing sizes) are quite common, and can be found in nearly any department store and online. Sizes larger than 4 are progressively less common, being found in only some stores and online, and usually only seasonally (peaking around October or November). The availability of larger-size sleepers in department stores also varies from year to year.

Alternative sources for larger-size, mass-produced sleepers include Internet auction sites, such as eBay, and certain mail order clothing retailers, such as Lands' End.

Individual blanket sleepers can be marketed either as a unisex garment, or as a garment intended for one gender. Even in the latter case, however, there is often no difference stylistically between sleepers marketed specifically for boys, and ones marketed specifically for girls. (The size numbers are also consistent, as, although there are slight differences in the meanings of size numbers between boys and girls in the U.S. standard clothing size system, these are too small to matter in the case of a garment as loose-fitting as a blanket sleeper). Occasionally, however, sleepers marketed for girls may include feminine decorative features such as lacy frills, and sleepers with screen-printed front panels may feature images of media characters appealing primarily to children of one gender. Also, the ranges of colors available may be different between the genders; in particular, pink sleepers are rarely worn by boys due to a cultural association of that color with femininity.

In smaller sizes, there is little or no difference in the availability of sleepers for boys and for girls. Sleepers for older boys are somewhat less common than those for older girls. Nevertheless, sleepers for both boys and girls continue to be available in department stores, mainly during the fall and winter seasons, and year-round on the internet up to size 16–18.

Blanket sleepers for adult women used to be relatively uncommon, but since 2010s have increased in popularity and can be found in many department stores, usually in the colder months.

Mass-produced blanket sleepers for adult men are more uncommon. However, major home sewing pattern publishers sometimes offer patterns for conventionally styled blanket sleepers in men's sizes, and in the Internet Age a cottage industry has developed, with several websites offering blanket sleepers manufactured on a small scale for men as well as women and children. Also, mass-produced, unisex-styled blanket sleepers marketed for women are sometimes purchased and worn by men, although the difference in the size ranges between men and women means that this option is available only to men of smaller stature.

== Terminology ==
The terminology relating to blanket sleepers can be confusing, and inconsistent between different speakers.

The terms sleeper and blanket sleeper are sometimes used interchangeably. Alternatively, a distinction may be made between the lighter-weight (footed, one-piece) sleepers worn by infants in warmer weather, and the heavier blanket sleepers worn by both infants and older children, primarily in colder weather. (In the loosest usage, sleeper by itself can mean any infant sleeping garment, regardless of form or features). Similarly, some people consider a blanket sleeper to be one-piece by definition, whereas a sleeper could be made either in one piece, or in two pieces meeting at the waist.

When blanket is omitted, either the singular form sleeper or the plural form sleepers may refer to a single garment. When blanket is included, however, a single garment is usually referred to using the singular form.

The terms (blanket) sleeper and footed pajamas may be used interchangeably. (This reflects the North American practice of referring to nearly any sleeping garment as pajamas, as blanket sleepers bear little resemblance to the jacket and trouser combination, originating in India, that the term pajamas originally referred to). Alternatively, sleeper may instead be used more narrowly than footed pajamas, to exclude footed sleeping garments that are lighter-weight and/or two-piece, such as footed "ski" style pajamas.

Also, while many people consider built-in feet to be part of the definition of sleeper, garments otherwise meeting the definition but lacking feet are sometimes marketed as footless blanket sleepers.

The term grow sleeper is sometimes used to refer to a two-piece footed sleeping garment with features designed to compensate for growth in the wearer, such as turn-back cuffs, or a double row of snap fasteners at the waist.

Other terms that are used more-or-less interchangeably with blanket sleeper include:

- footies or feeties
- footed sleeper
- footed pajamas (variants include foot/footy/footed/footsie/feet/feety/feeted/feetsie and may use colloquial terms for pajamas such as pjs or jammies)
- pajamas with (the) feet (in/on them)
- padded feet pajamas
- bunny (feet) pajamas or bunny suit
- one-piece pajamas
- zip-up pajamas
- pajama blanket
- sleeper/sleeping suit
- sleeper blanket
- sherpa sleeper
- walking blanket
- walking sleeper
- sleeper walker
- oversleeper (used in advertisements by J. C. Penney)
- nighties
- onesie
- potato mashers
- dormer (older girls' and women's sizes only)

Also, a number of commercial brand names have been adopted as genericized trademarks. The best known of these is Dr. Dentons, but others used include "Big Feet", Trundle Bundle (common usage on the Southside of Chicago), and Jama-Blanket.

Formerly used, obsolete terms include:

- night drawers
- sleeping drawers
- sleeping garment (used in advertisements by Doctor Denton Sleeping Mills)
- coverlet sleeper
- pajunion (used in advertisements by Brighton-Carlsbad)

In British English, the term with a meaning closest to that of blanket sleeper is sleepsuit, but it is also known as a romper suit.

Infants' garments similar to blanket sleepers, but with the bottom portion constructed like a bag, without separate leg enclosures, are usually not considered sleepers, but rather are referred to by other terms such as baby sleep bag, bunting, sleeping bag, go go bag, sleep sack, or grow bag.

Infants' garments similar to blanket sleepers, but designed for use as outerwear rather than sleepwear (and usually featuring hoods and hand covers), are referred to by other terms such as pram suit, snowsuit, or carriage suit. Some such garments are designed for dual use as both sleepwear and playwear, these are sometimes known as sleep 'n' play suits.

== History ==
The origins of the blanket sleeper can be traced at least as far back as the late 19th century, to footed, one-piece sleeping garments for children, then known as night drawers. The first company to mass-produce blanket sleepers was Doctor Denton Sleeping Mills, which started using the term "sleeping garment", for their garments, starting in 1865, and most had buttons instead of zippers (since the zipper wasn't invented until the early 20th century), and trap-doors or butt-flaps in the back, as early blanket sleepers, quite obviously, took on the same basic design as the traditional union-suit (which may have been where the idea of the sleeper originated; as the children's version of their fathers' union-suits). However, the blanket sleeper first took something closely resembling its present form in the early 1950s, when many of the most recognizable features were first adopted, including the use of synthetic fabrics, slip-resistant soles, toe caps, rib-knit collar and cuffs, zipper closure, snap tab, and applique. The term blanket sleeper also first came into common use at this time, although sleeper by itself appeared considerably earlier.

Sleepers made before the 1950s were usually made from knitted natural fabrics, either cotton, wool (especially merino), or a mixture of both. Commonly used fabrics included outing flannel and flannelette. (Home-made sleepers were typically made out of fabric pieces cut from actual blankets.) The soles of the feet were usually made from the same material as the rest of the sleeper, though sometimes two layers were used for improved durability. The collar and cuffs were usually hemmed, and the sleeper usually closed with buttons, either in the front or in the back.

Natural fabrics were largely abandoned after the Flammable Fabrics Act of 1953, which imposed strict flammability requirements on children's sleepwear sold in the United States, up to size 14. Flammability requirements were tightened further in the early 1970s, and in 1977 the flame-retarding additive tris was discovered to be carcinogenic, prompting a recall, and leading to the abandonment of such additives and the materials that depended on them for their flame-resistance.

The popularity of blanket sleepers for older children got a boost in the 1970s and early 1980s due to the energy crises of 1973 and 1979. Advertisements from this period often emphasized that thermostats could be set lower at night when children slept in blanket sleepers.

== Variations ==
Blanket sleepers sometimes depart from the standard design by incorporating unusual or uncommon features. An incomplete list of these follows.

Drop seat
One of the features most commonly associated with blanket sleepers in the public imagination, the drop seat (also known as a trap door or butt flap) is an opening in the buttocks area, traditionally closing with buttons, designed to allow the wearer to use the toilet without removing the sleeper. Drop seats were very common on sleepers made before the 1950s, but today they are rather rare. (Similar drop seats were also a common feature on the traditional union suit.)
Modern versions of the drop seat often replace the buttons with snap fasteners.

Snap front/legs
Some sleepers, especially in infant sizes, replace the usual front zipper with a front opening closing with snap fasteners. In infant sizes, this opening usually forks at the crotch, and extends down the insides of both legs to the ankles, in order to give access for diaper changes. This design tends to be less effective at eliminating drafts than the zipper closure, and is most often seen on lighter-weight sleepers designed for warmer weather.
Some infant-size blanket sleepers made in the 1960s featured an ankle-to-ankle zipper through the crotch, serving a similar function.

Snap waist/back

Two-piece sleepers sometimes fasten around the waist with snap fasteners. This is most often seen on so-called grow sleepers, made mainly in toddler sizes, with features designed to extend the useful life of the garment by compensating for growth in the wearer. These are usually made in lighter material than one-piece sleepers, with an especially high waist, two rows of snaps on the top piece, a back opening on the top piece also closing with snaps, and turn-back cuffs.
Two-piece sleepers made before the 1950s often fastened similarly around the waist with buttons.

Drawstring cuffs
A common feature on sleepers until about the 1930s was turn-back cuffs closing at the ends with drawstrings, designed to fully enclose the wearer's hands. According to advertisements, these were intended both to keep the wearer's hands warm, and to discourage thumb or finger sucking. (These were mostly found on smaller sizes, but have appeared on Dr. Denton brand sleepers in sizes for children as old as 10 years.)

Costume sleepers
Occasionally garments are made that are designed to serve a dual function, as both blanket sleeper and fancy dress costume (similar to the ones worn by American children on Halloween). Animal costume sleepers are the most common, often featuring hoods with costume ears, tails, and/or hand covers resembling paws. Other motifs such as superheroes, cartoon characters or clowns are also sometimes seen.
The use of the terms bunny suit and bunny pajamas as synonyms for blanket sleeper references the persistent cultural meme of a blanket sleeper fashioned as a (usually pink) bunny costume, with a hood, long ears, and puffy tail.
A related phenomenon in Japan, of footless, lighter-weight, hooded, one-piece animal costume pajamas, is known there as disguise pajama or kigurumi (although the latter term can also refer to costumes that are not intended as sleepwear).

=== Minor variations ===
Side zipper
A rare alternative to the center front zipper is the "side zipper", running from the neckline near one shoulder (usually the left) to the outside or front ankle. This is most commonly found on sleepers with an elaborate printed design on the front, in which case it serves to avoid disruption of the image.

An even rarer variation is to have zippers on both sides.

Back zipper
Although back closings using buttons were common on sleepers made before the 1950s, zippers in the back are uncommon in regular children's sleepers. A back zipper may make it difficult for the wearer to remove the sleeper for bathroom use. Most examples in regular sleepers date from the 1950–1970s as back zippers became less prevalent in the 1980s. Today, back zippers can most commonly be found on sleepers for wearers where it is advantageous to prevent the wearer removing their sleeper, especially those who wear diapers and have a tendency to remove them.

Self-fabric feet
Sleepers made in sizes for infants who are too young to walk often omit the slip-resistant soles on the feet, instead having soles made from the same fabric as the rest of the sleeper. This is also occasionally seen on sleepers for older girls or women.

Bound feet
On sleepers made since the 1980s, the soles of the feet usually attach to the upper foot pieces with an inward-facing seam. In preceding years, it was more common for the seam to face outward, and to be covered with a narrow strip of material, forming a kind of ridge around the perimeter of the sole. This design was referred to in advertisements as a bound edge or bound foot, and was intended both to improve durability, and to improve comfort by eliminating a potential source of irritation.

Molded plastic feet
Around 1970, some sleepers were made with foot bottoms made from three-dimensional molded plastic. This feature proved unpopular, and was quickly abandoned.

Detachable feet
Occasionally, rather than having permanently attached feet, sleepers will come with separate feet, similar to slippers. This is more common on adult sizes.

Convertible feet
Another variation replaces the permanently enclosed feet with "convertible" foot coverings resembling tube socks, that close at the ends with velcro, and can be rolled back to expose the feet when desired.

Hood
Attached hoods were occasionally seen on sleepers made before the 1920s, and as late as the 1940s the company that made Dr. Denton brand sleepers offered separate "sleeping hoods", designed to be used in conjunction with their sleepers, in sizes for both children and adults. On modern sleepers attached hoods are extremely rare, found only on a handful of sleepers for older girls and women, and costume sleepers.

Mittens
Attached mittens were occasionally seen on sleepers made for infants, usually to prevent finger or thumb sucking, but also served the dual purpose of keeping the hands warm. Mittens can also be used on costume sleepers for both children and adults

Quilted fabric
Sleepers are occasionally made from a quilted fabric, incorporating a thin layer of polyester fiberfill batting for increased warmth. Quilted sleepers using polyester foam as insulation were also made in the 1950s.

Elastic back waist
Sleepers in larger sizes sometimes feature an elastic band along the rear half of the waist, designed to provide a better fit by reducing bagginess around the torso.

== See also ==
- Layette

=== Related garments ===
- Playsuit (children's clothing)
