= Playsuit =

A playsuit can be:

- One-piece garment of a child or a woman like romper suit or jumpsuit but with short legs.
- A type of bodysuit, a women's undergarment with one-piece form-fitting, and/or skin-tight garment
