= Tick-a-Tee =

British children's clothing manufacturer

Tick-a-Tee Kiddies Wear was a British children's clothing manufacturer that operated in Maryport, Cumbria, from 1939 to 1987.

Tick-a-Tee was founded in 1939 by Max Steiner, who left Vienna in 1938 following the Anschluss. Early on, they received a contract from Marks & Spencer, and at their peak were employing 300 people.

A 1948 buster suit is in the permanent collection of London's Victoria and Albert Museum. A 1973-74 pantsuit is in the permanent collection of the Metropolitan Museum of Art's Costume Institute in New York City.
