= Q Park =

Korean American internet personality and musician

Q Park (also known as QPark) is an American YouTuber, entertainer, and musician. He rose to prominence on Vine, where he gained 3.5 million followers before the platform shut down. He then moved to Facebook, Instagram, and YouTube where he began posting comedy sketches, reaction videos, challenges, and videos in which he performs popular songs in public.

As of January 2025, Park had 37.7 million TikTok followers.

== Career ==
Park was born in New York and is of South Korean descent. He graduated from Yale University. He then worked as an investment banker on Wall Street working over 100 hours a week until eventually quitting. He then opened and operated several restaurants until realizing he didn't have a passion for creating food. In 2014, as his social media content started flourishing, he sold the restaurants to pursue content creation full-time.

Park first rose to social media stardom on the 6-second video platform, Vine, where he gained 3.5 million followers. After Vine shut down, he expanded his work to Facebook, Instagram, and YouTube. His breakout video on YouTube was of him walking around New York City for 10 hours wearing a romper. It garnered 2 million views in a few months. Later that year, he posted a video of him walking for 10 hours in New York City with a Kim Jong Un lookalike. The video received nearly 10 million views on YouTube within the first two months of uploading.

Park collaborates with his partner Edith, who does most of his camera work and occasionally appears in front of the camera. Park has stated that it is important for him to avoid playing into Asian stereotypes, and that he tries to portray Asians, in particular Asian men, in a different light, given their limited representation in traditional media.

In 2018, Park posted a video dancing to Cardi B's songs titled "When Cardi B takes over you" which Cardi B reposted on her Instagram page. That year he also posted a video performing various Bollywood songs on the streets of New York City. His video mimicking Neymar's soccer game falls in New York also gained over one million views on YouTube in just two days that year.

When interviewed about a potential U.S. TikTok ban in 2025, Park stated that "if you have faith in your ability to create content, you'll build a following somewhere else" and that TikTok might be "too big to fail." That year, he quickly went viral for two videos performing Jombriel's "La Parte y La Choke" and "Vitamina".

== Music ==
In January 2020, Park released his first original single "Ay Ay Ay," a reggaeton song sung entirely in Spanish inspired by the Latin music and community he admires. The music video was filmed in Puerto Rico and New York City. He told Billboard he first encountered reggaeton during his 2004 trip to Puerto Rico where he heard Daddy Yankee's "Gasolina" playing in the streets.

Park has written his own music since childhood. He plays the guitar, piano, and drums.
