= Siren suit =

Type of one-piece garment

The siren suit is a one-piece garment for the whole body which can easily be put on or taken off, originally designed for use on the way to, and in, air-raid shelters. The suit solved the problems of warmth and modesty encountered when seeking shelter during nighttime air raids in the United Kingdom during World War II. It was roomy and could be put on over night clothes quickly when an imminent air raid was announced by the sirens.

The suit was worn by both children and adults when sheltering in either back garden or public shelters.

== History ==
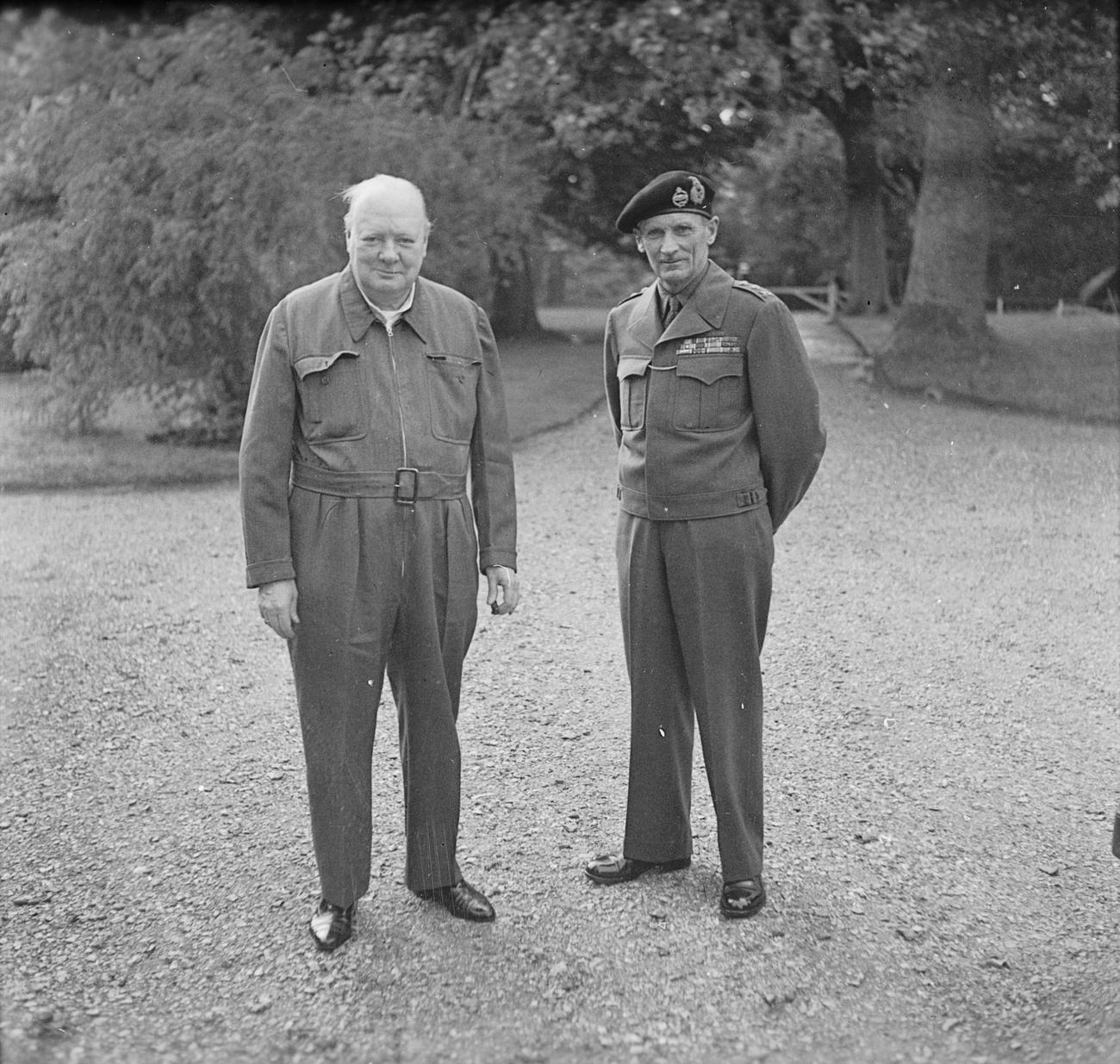
Winston Churchill wearing a siren suit beside Field Marshal Bernard Montgomery in the United Kingdom during World War II

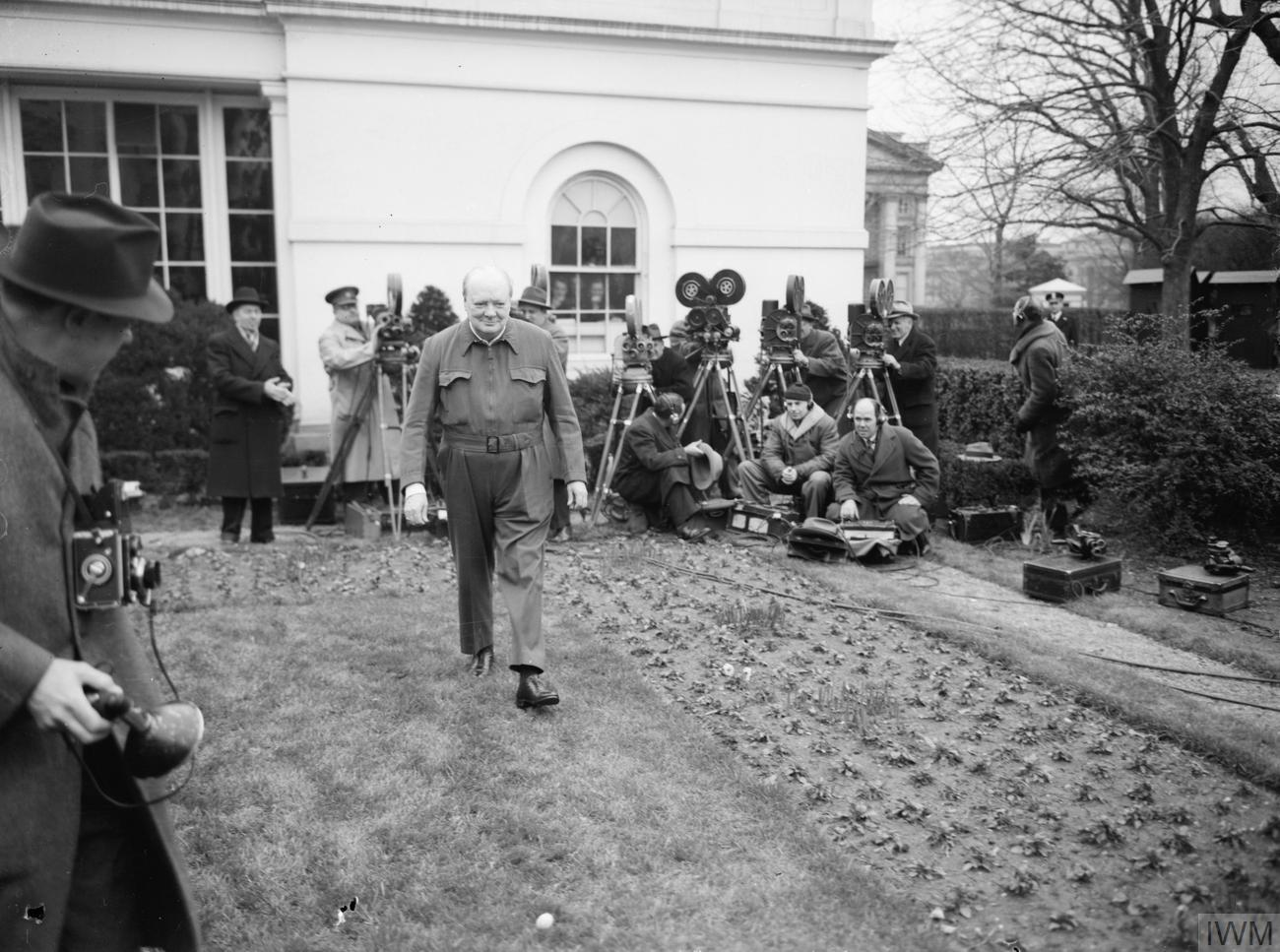
Churchill wearing a siren suit at the White House in Washington, D.C.

Similar in style to boilersuits worn by many workers, including mechanics, bricklayers, and tank crews to protect their standard clothing, the siren suit was invented by Winston Churchill as an original leisure suit in the 1930s. He played a large part in popularising it as an item of clothing during World War II, wearing it regularly, including when meeting other important people, such as U.S. President Franklin D. Roosevelt, General Dwight Eisenhower, and Soviet leader Joseph Stalin.

The advantages of clothing that could be easily and quickly put on over other clothing led to the adoption of this style of suit during the war by many who were forced to leave their homes to seek shelter during air raids. Warning of the raids was given by sirens, so these suits came to be known as siren suits.

Wearing dresses or professional clothing while in an air raid shelter may not have been very practical.

== Construction ==
Siren suits were constructed in a loose-cut design, with zippered or button closures, an optional belt, and large simple pockets. The suits were made of many fabrics, most typically wool, cotton, or other materials available under clothing rationing. Suits could be bought ready-made or could be hand-made with a pattern and available fabrics. Some suits had a panel at the back that opened to allow the wearer to use a toilet without removing the entire suit.

== In popular culture ==
Winston Churchill was a famous wearer, having a pin stripe version, which he wore during the war years and then for portraits by Oscar Nemon and Frank O. Salisbury in the 1950s. Another suit, made of bottle-green velvet, was created for him by Turnbull & Asser. Austin Reed also made him a suit. In 2002, one of his grey pinstripe suits was sold for £29,875.

The suits are a common motif in descriptions of war-time childhoods.

== Children's siren suits ==
Although early siren suits were fashionable, siren suits for children were more geared towards comfort for the children seeking shelter during an air raid rather than style. The children's suits were advertised as onesies "knitted with 10 ounces of 4-ply wool"; they were not marketed as being for protection during air raids like men's siren suits. The suits featured a fur-lined hood to keep the child's head and ears warm as they sought shelter.

== Women's siren suits ==
In addition to being protective gear, siren suits for women were fashion statements and were marketed as such to avoid causing fear regarding the threat of raids. Some women claimed wearing the siren suit "protected their modesty" in a comfortable way.
