= Boilersuit =

Loose-fitting protective suit

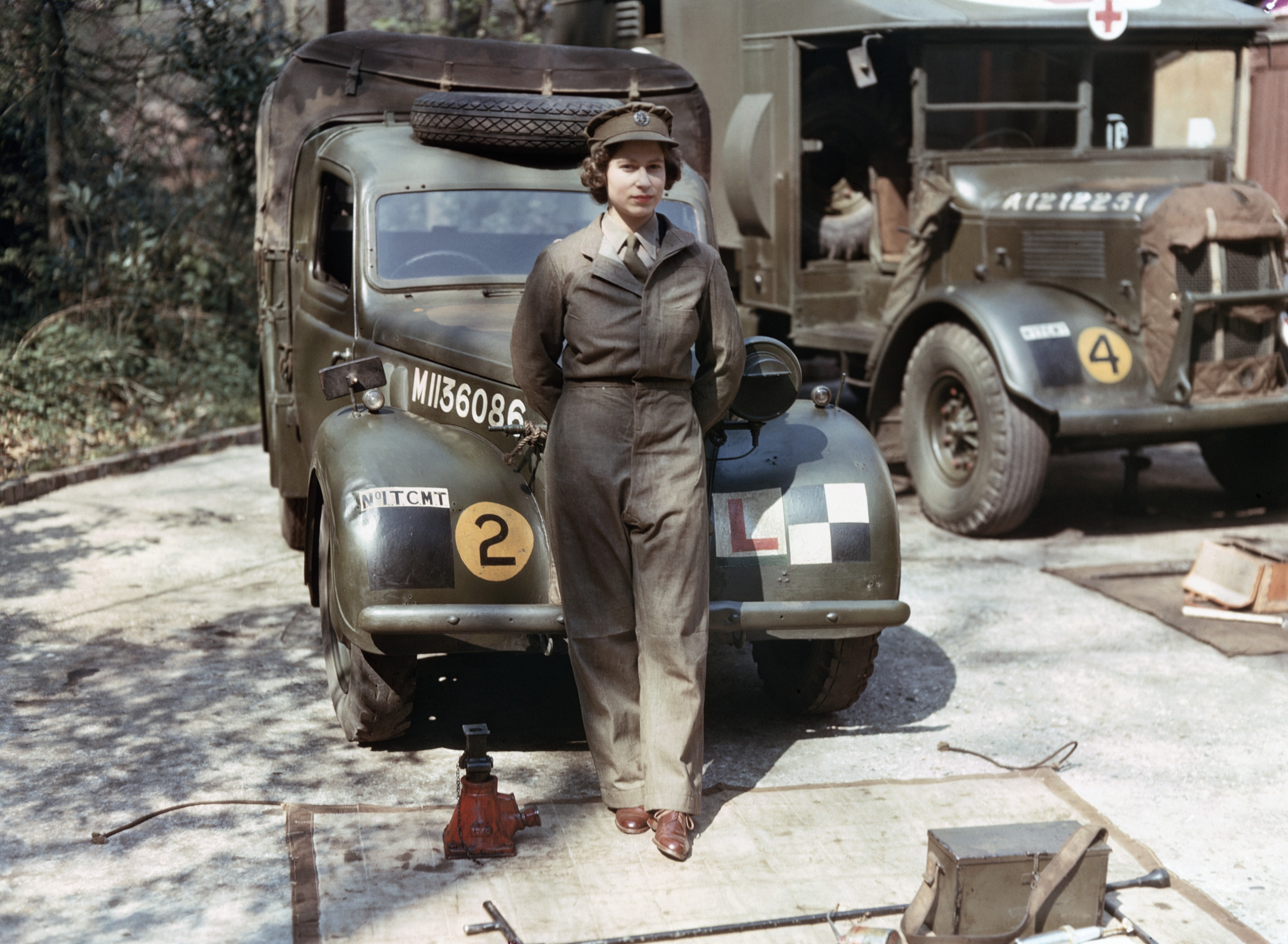
Princess Elizabeth wearing a boilersuit while serving in the Auxiliary Territorial Service during World War II

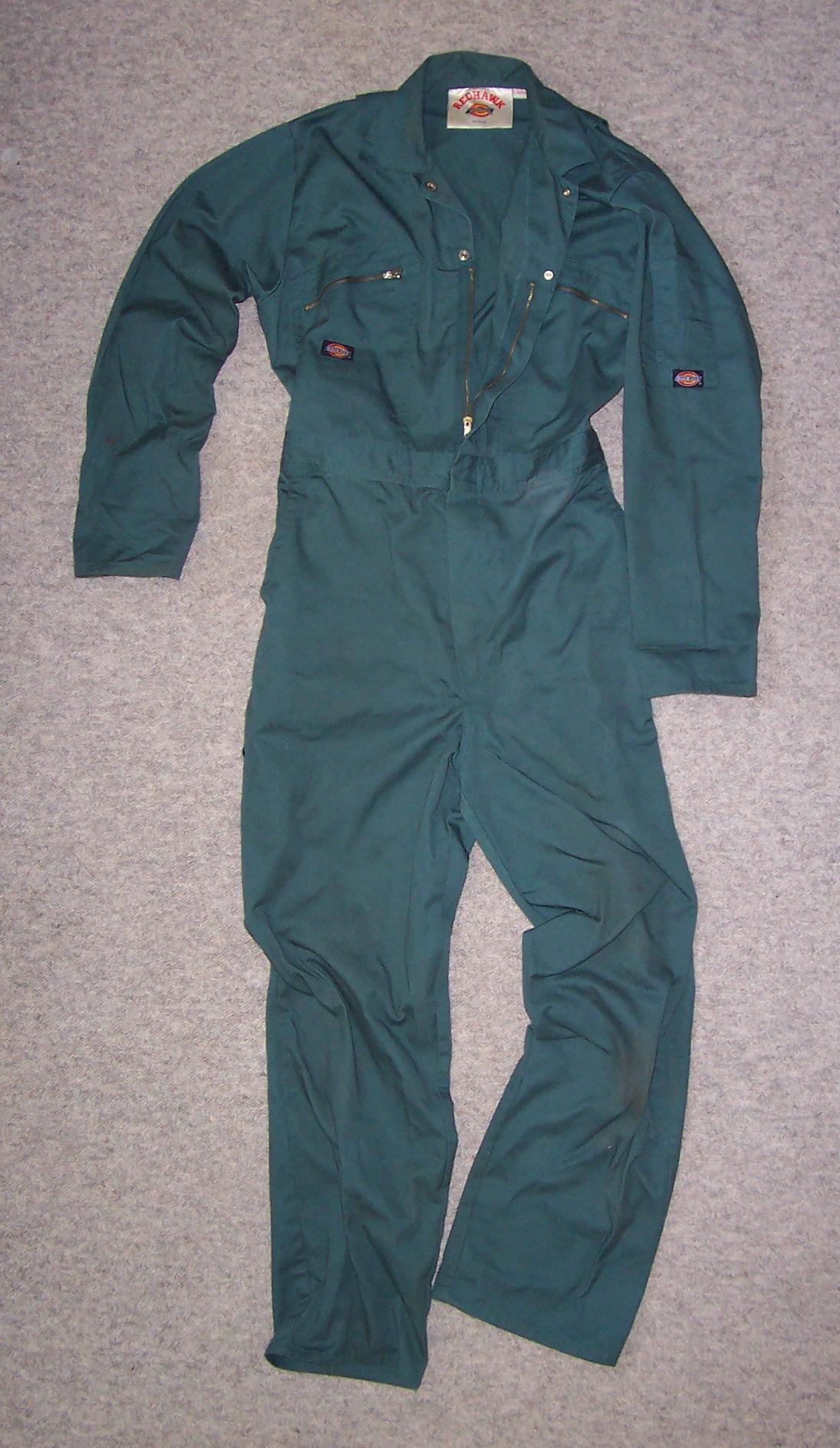
A boilersuit coverall

A boilersuit (or boiler suit), also known as coveralls, is a loose-fitting garment covering the whole body except for the head, hands and feet.

== Terminology ==
The term boilersuit is most common in the UK, where the 2023 edition of the Oxford English Dictionary lists the word as having been first used on 31 July 1883 in the Liverpool Mercury newspaper. The garments are typically known as coveralls in North America, while overall(s) is used elsewhere. In North America, "overall" is more usually understood as a bib-and-brace overall, which is a type of trousers with a bib and attached suspenders.

A more tight-fitting garment that is otherwise similar to a boilersuit is usually called a jumpsuit.

The "siren suit" popularized by Winston Churchill during the Second World War was similar to a boilersuit in that it was a loose, one piece garment that could quickly and easily be donned over nightwear to provide warmth and modesty while seeking shelter during nighttime air raids.

== Description ==
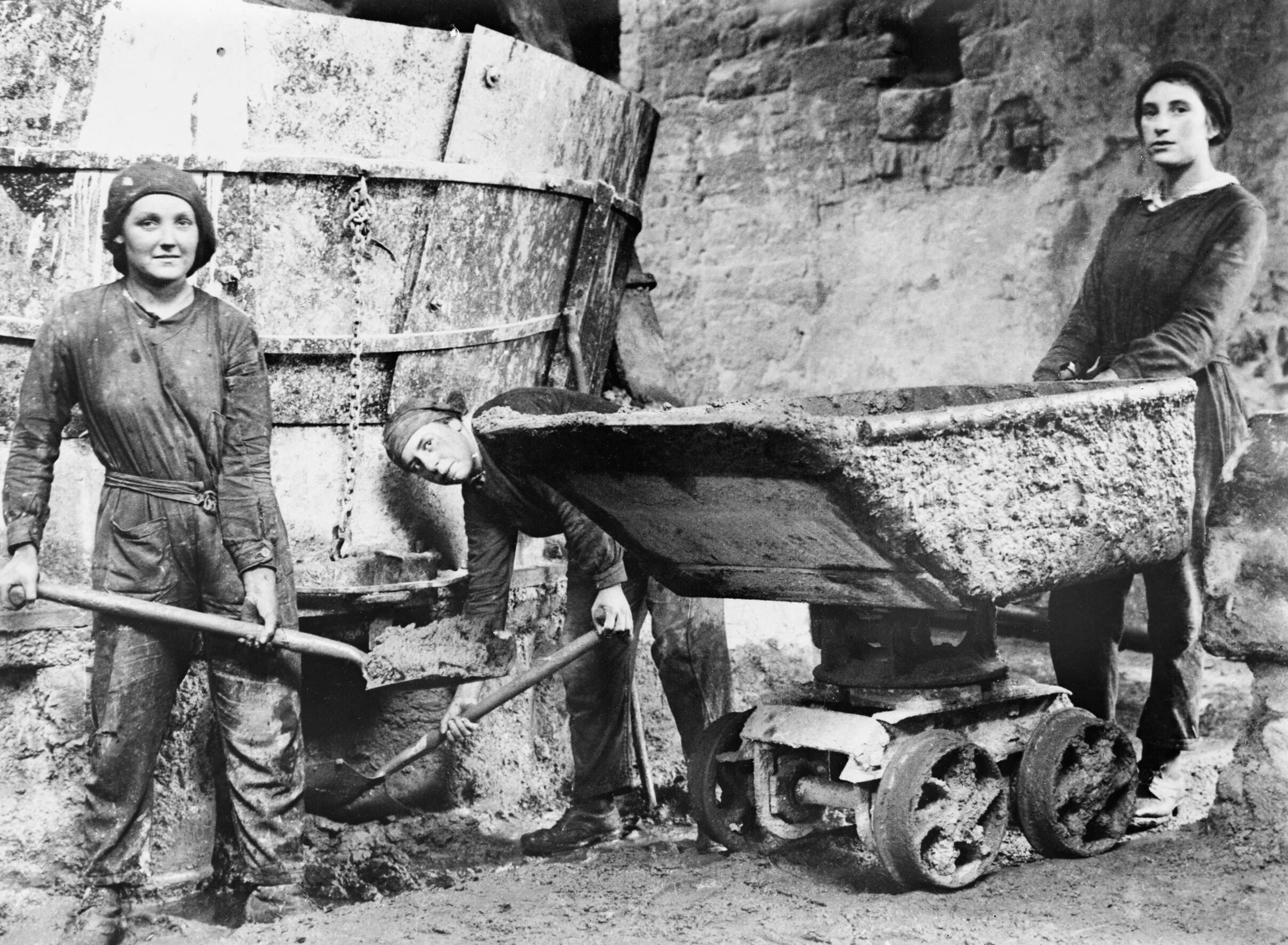
Workers in a brickworks wearing boilersuits, 1918

A boilersuit is a one-piece garment with full-length sleeves and legs like a jumpsuit, but usually less tight-fitting. Its main feature is that it has no gap between jacket and trousers or between lapels, and no loose jacket tails. It often has a long thin pocket down the outside of the right thigh to hold long tools. It usually has a front fastening extending the whole length of the front of the body up to the throat, with no lapels. It may be fastened with buttons, a zip, velcro, or snap fasteners. Boilersuits with an attached hood are available. The word "boilersuit" may also refer to disposable garments such as DuPont's Tyvek suits.

== Usage ==
Coveralls are most often worn as protective clothing over "street" clothes at work. They can be used for painting and decorating, mechanical work, farming, factory work, and other activities where clothes may become soiled. Many companies provide workers with corporate branded boilersuits for identification and marketing.

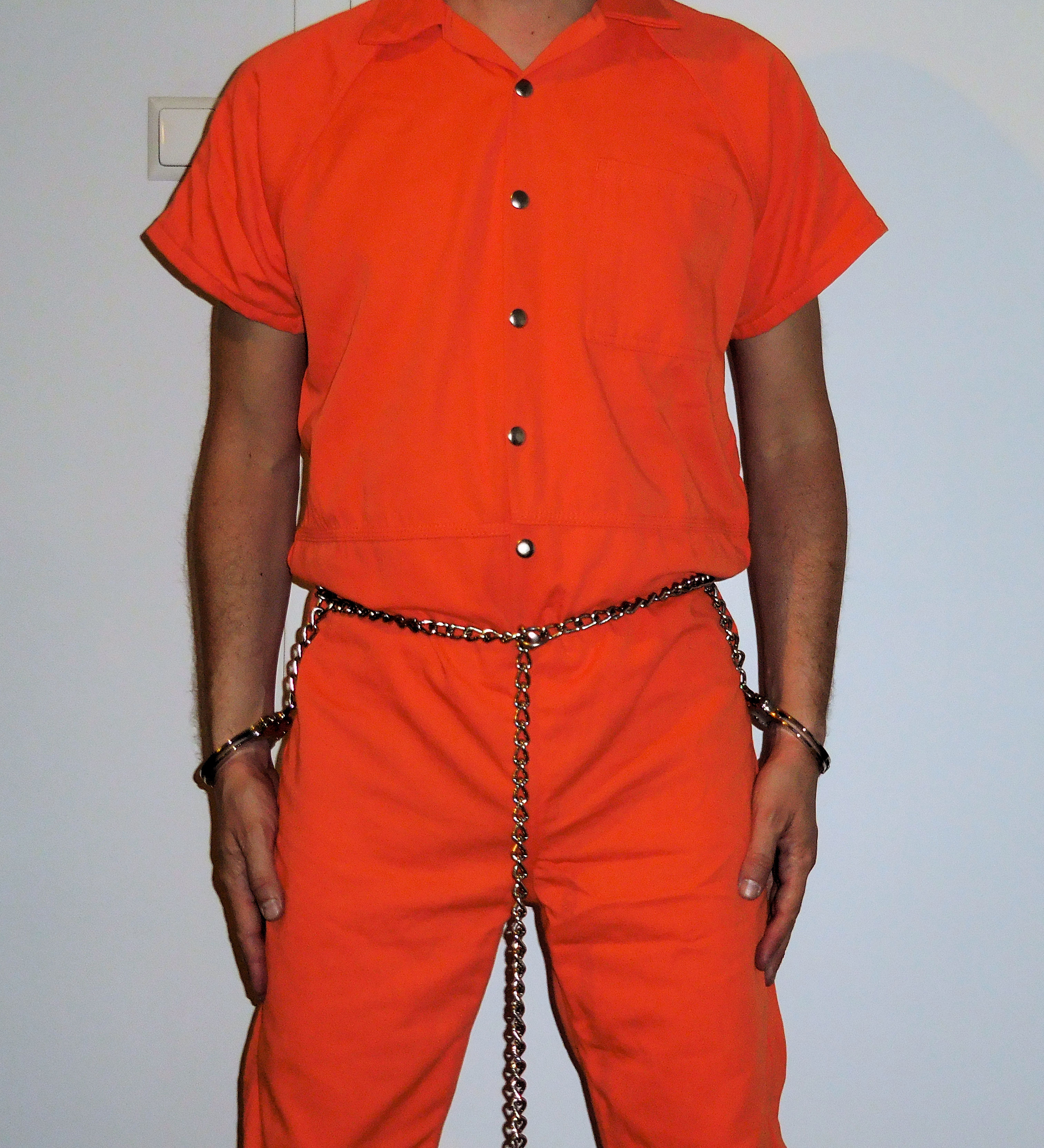
A prison coverall

Coveralls are also sometimes used as prison uniforms in the U.S and other countries.

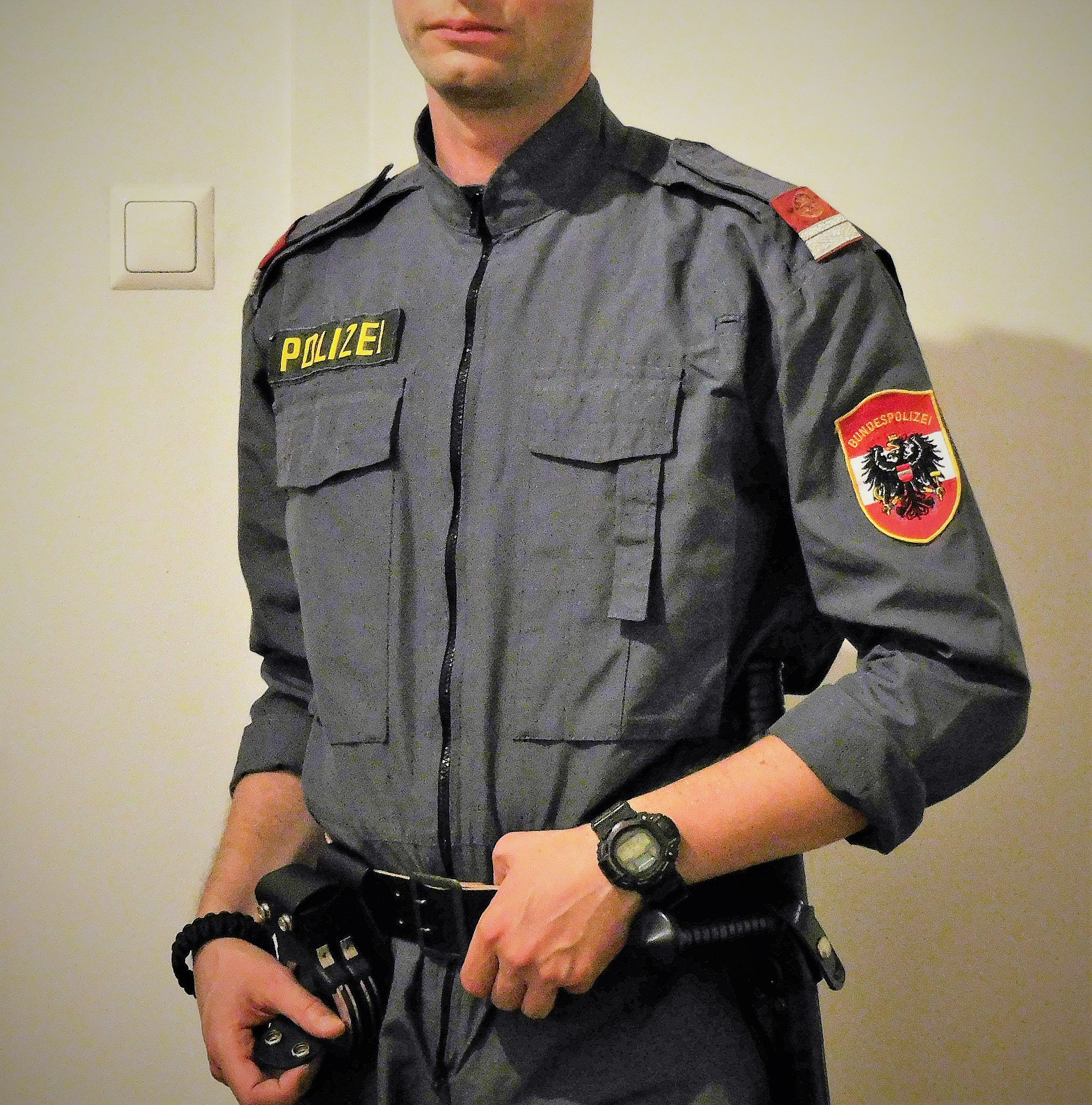
A police coverall

Police tactical units often use boilersuits as a uniform, for instance the French police unit Compagnies Républicaines de Sécurité, and the Austrian units EKO Cobra and WEGA. Similar coveralls made of Nomex in olive drab (and more recently, desert tan) are also used by the crews of armoured fighting vehicles in the US Army and Marine Corps, where the men and also their suits are sometimes called "CVCs", an abbreviation of "Combat Vehicle Crewman".

More form fitting coveralls with many zippered pockets, originally made of cotton treated for flame resistance, but made of Nomex since the late 1960s, have been used as flight suits since the beginning of World War II. There are two main categories for coveralls: cloth and disposable.

Both cloth and disposable coveralls are manufactured with their own unique protective properties including: high-visibility, insulation to protect against cold weather, waterproof, flame resistant to protect against fire, arc resistant to protect against flash fires, and even microporous fabrics when exposed to hazardous chemicals.

Japanese politicians have been known to use boiler suits to convey an image of preparedness.

Coveralls called student boilersuits are used by university students in some Nordic countries as a sort of party-uniform, with insignia on the back and colour varying with programme and university.

The suit is associated with the slasher subgenre, being worn by Michael Myers of the Halloween films.

Pete Townshend of The Who frequently wore a white boiler suit during performances and in publicity photographs from 1969-71.

The Church of Scientology has punished Sea Org members in the Rehabilitation Project Force by making them wear black boiler suits.

== See also ==
- Flight suit
- Speedsuit
- Onesie (jumpsuit)
