= Racing suit (disambiguation) =

Racing suit is a special clothing worn by racing drivers during races.

Racing suit may also refer to:

- Competitive swimwear, swimsuits used in swimming, diving, triathlon, water polo, et cetera
- NASCAR racing suit
- Nomex suit, a trademarked flame-resistant fabric developed by DuPont, used in fire protection equipment
- Motorcycle leathers, motorcycle personal protective equipment
- Tracksuit, a jacket and trouser designed to keep the body warm during and after athletic activity, but also commonly used as casual clothing ("athleisure")
- Ski racing suit, various types of suits used in alpine, biathlon and cross-country skiing

== See also ==
- Speedsuit, clothes designed for quick changes
