= Babygrow =

One-piece clothing item for infants

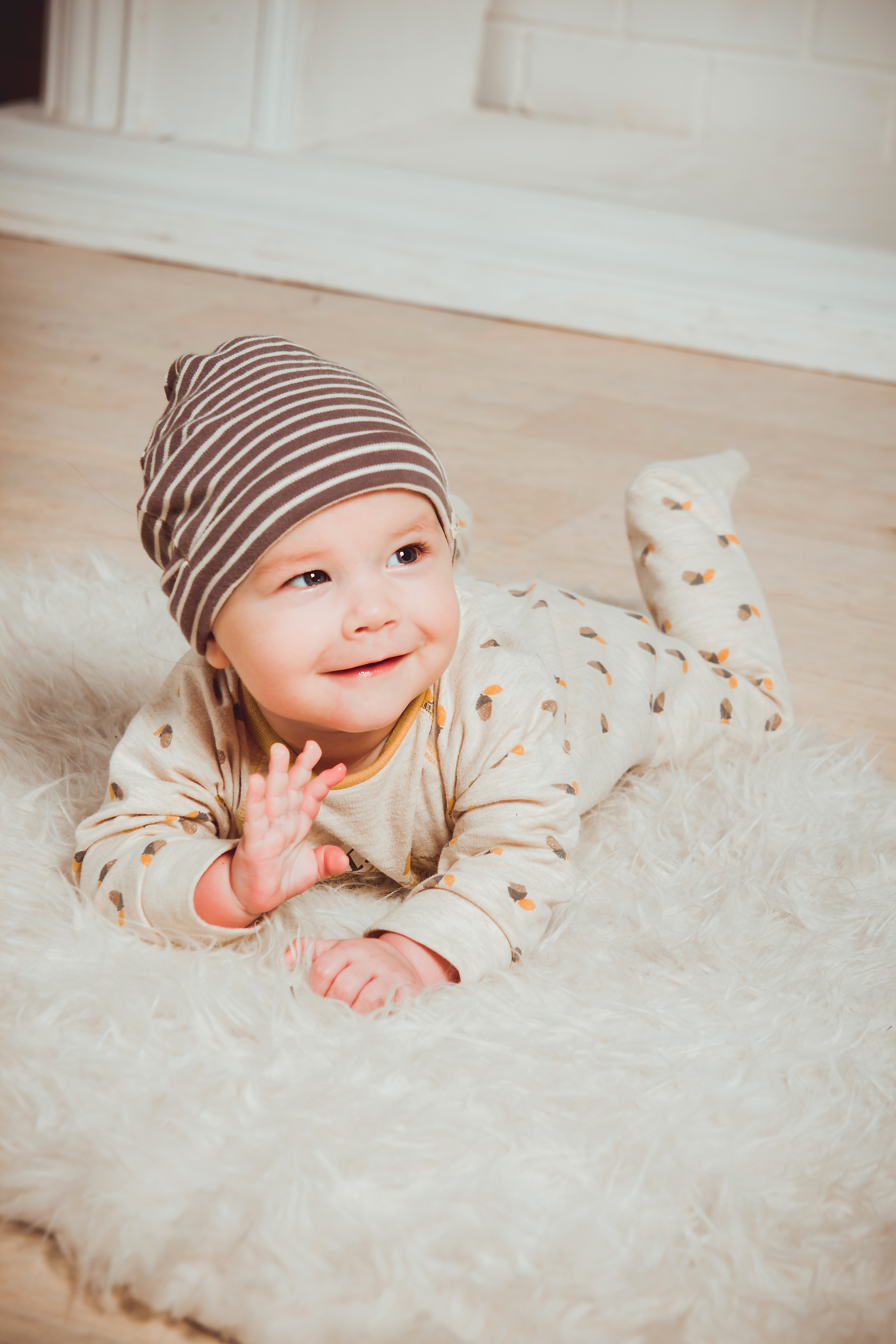
- Baby wearing a babygrow
- Type: Nightwear

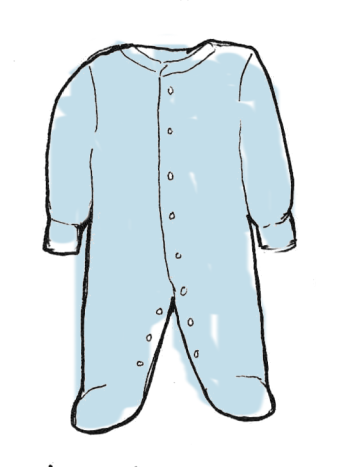
Illustration of a babygrow with snap fasteners.

A babygrow, babygro, sleepsuit, sleep suit or stretch & grow in British English is a one-piece item of baby clothing with long sleeves and legs used for sleep and everyday wear. They are typically made from cotton and closed with snaps, although they may also be made from fleece or closed with zips. The feet are often enclosed, but they may be footless. They are distinguished from bodysuits by having legs and long sleeves.

This terminology is common in the United Kingdom, where the trademark is not registered. In the United States, where the trademark is registered, the name is uncommon as other manufacturers of the item use different terms.

== Synonyms ==
In American English, different terms are more usual. The most common are sleeper or sleep and play. If made of fleece, they are considered blanket sleepers. They may also be referred to in American English simply as pajamas or one-pieces, or if they have feet as footie pajamas or footed one-pieces. If closed with a zipper, they may be referred to as zipper pajamas, zip up pajamas, or simply zip pajamas.

== History ==
Babygro is a trademark brand, invented in the U.S. in the 1950s by Walter Artzt.

== See also ==
- Romper suit
- Infant bodysuit
