= Speedsuit =

Type of unisex clothing

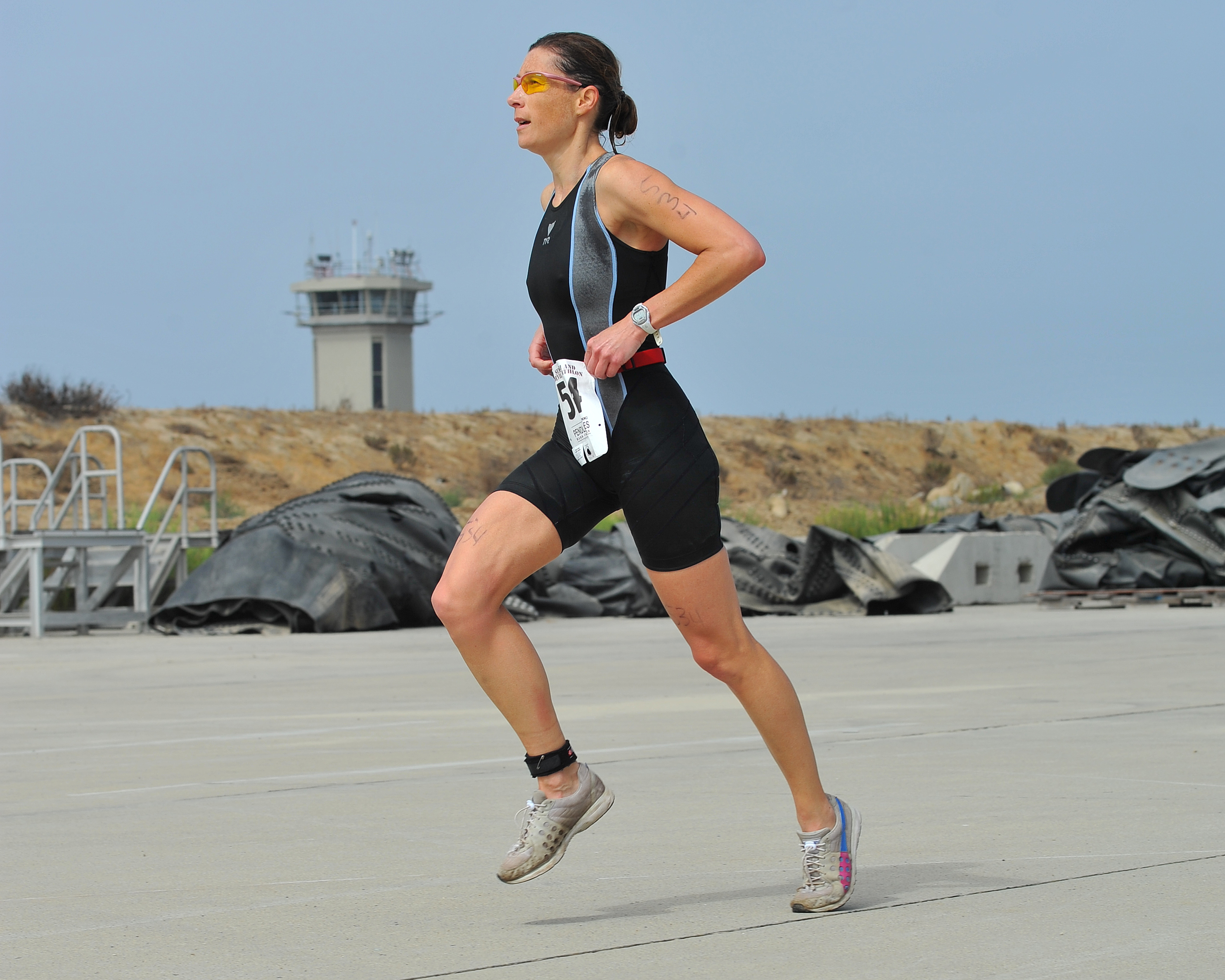
A woman wearing a speedsuit in a triathlon

A speedsuit is an item of unisex exercise attire or an industrial uniform used when quick clothing changes are necessary. It is either a single piece of clothing which tightly fits the torso and, optionally, varying amounts of the arms and legs; overall, it is similar to a leotard, though intentionally made especially tight and constricting to hug the body for varying purposes of warmth (when used in snowboarding or skiing) and hydrodynamics (when used in swimming and other water sports), or it is a tight fitting collared jumpsuit similar to coveralls.

== In popular culture ==
A running gag in The Venture Bros., beginning with the episode "Hate Floats", is Dr. Venture's assertions regarding the superiority of a "speedsuit" and his desire to outfit his son Dean in a speedsuit, initially for his birthday and later as a rite of passage. A gag in the initial episode mentions how a speedsuit is what a "super-scientist" wears "for the rest of his life", and explanation within the imagined reality of the show for the reason why animated characters are always shown in the same clothing and animated in the same outfits regardless of the circumstance. In the show a speedsuit is a short sleeve jumpsuit. The term has now made its way into the vernacular of the jumpsuit/work uniform industry.

== See also ==
- Aquapel
- Coveralls
- LZR Racer
- Ski suit
- Sportswear (activewear)
- Racing suit (disambiguation)
