= Jumpsuit =

One-piece garment

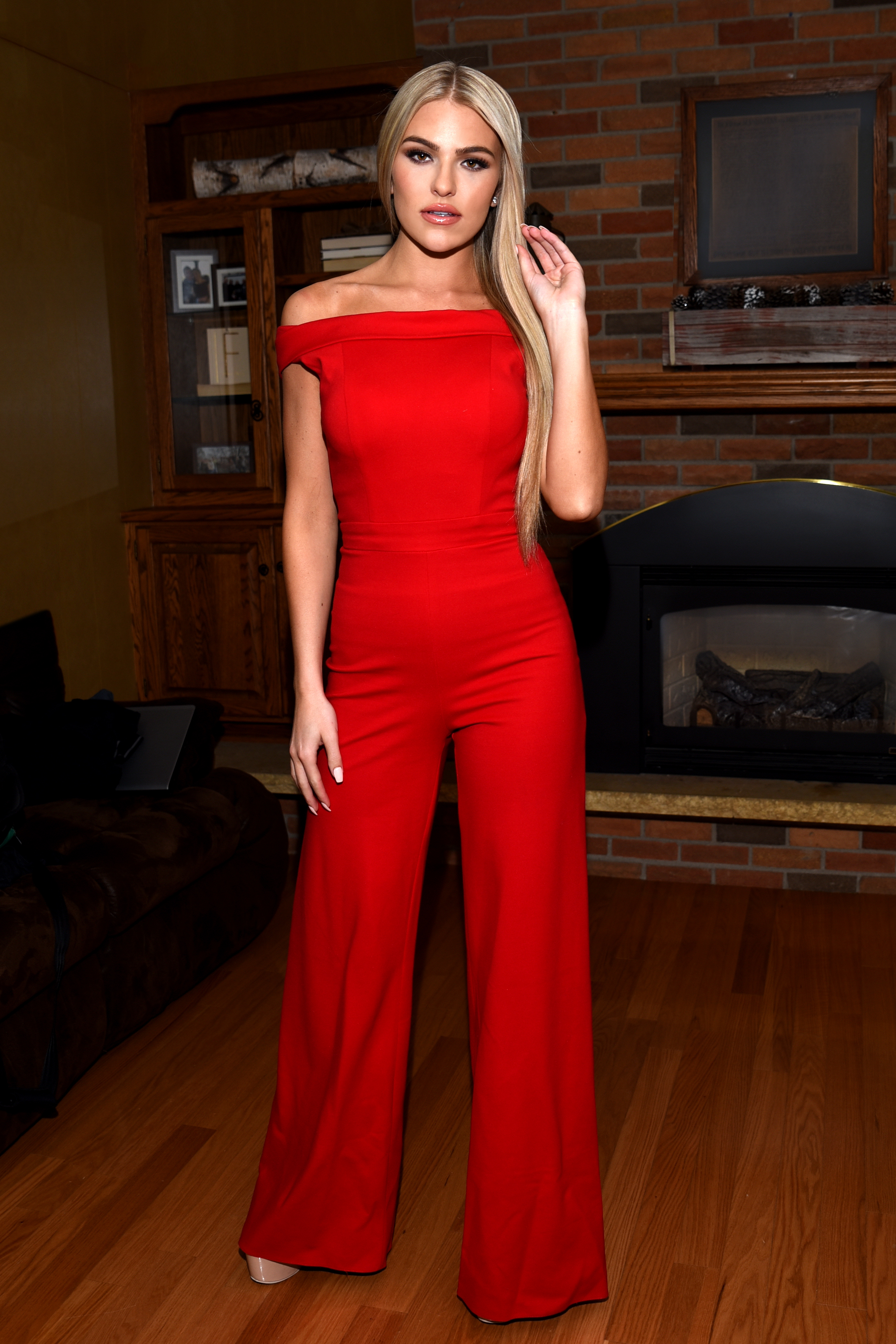
Woman wearing a modern-day high-fashion jumpsuit

A jumpsuit is a one-piece garment with sleeves and legs and typically without integral coverings for feet, hands or head. The original jump suit is the functional one-piece garment used by parachutists.

The original skydivers' jumpsuits were simple garments designed to insulate the body from the colder temperatures associated with higher altitudes and minimize the risk of covering important handles and grips. Today, however, the garment has found other uses.

Jumpsuits are generally regarded as a garment of convenience as they are simpler, lighter and more flexible to wear. They have become more of a "put-on-and-remove" garment than an ensemble outfit. However, unless the jumpsuit has an opening on the rear (a "drop seat"), it is necessary to remove it entirely for bathroom use.

== History of the jumpsuit ==
A jumpsuit is a one-piece outfit which fits slim and covers the arms and legs. Its history goes back to 1919. It was created as a functional garment for parachutists to jump from planes. The boiler suit and dungarees were also used for a similar purpose. Amongst the three utility wear garments (jumpsuits, boiler suits and dungarees) jumpsuits were the first one to become fashion wear. The reason was its slimmer cut.

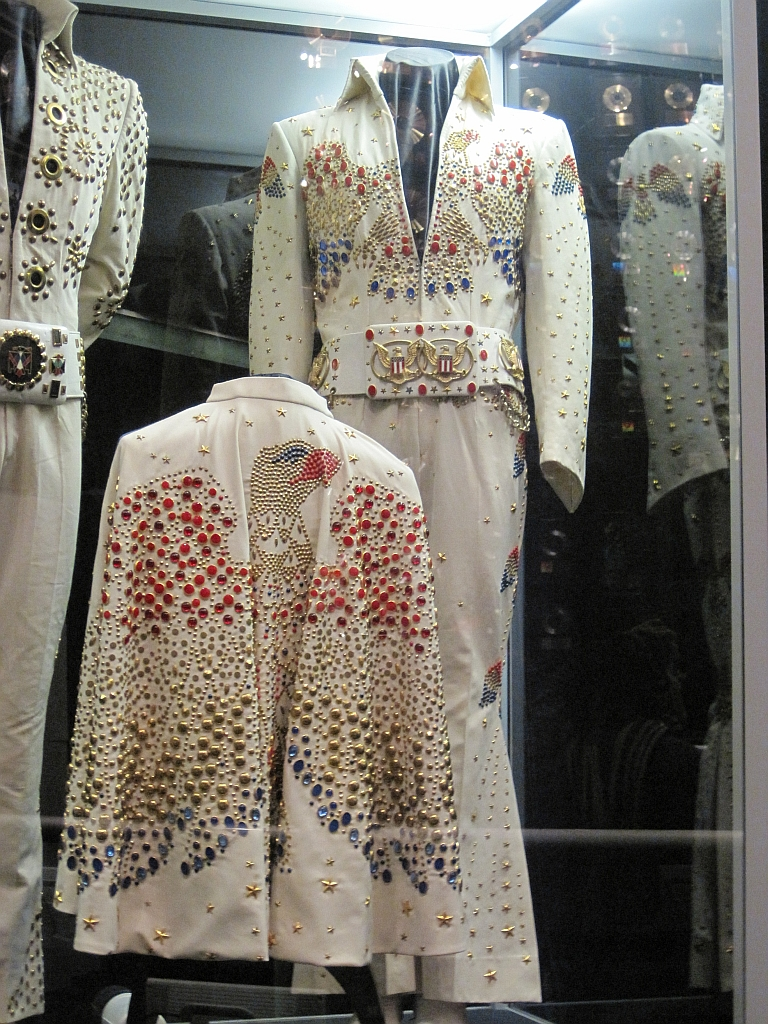
Elvis Presley's jumpsuit

In the 1930s, fashion designer Elsa Schiaparelli began designing jumpsuits for women. Her designs were the talk of the town but were worn by only a few. Then came the sporty styles by the American designer Vera Maxwell in the mid-1940s. It was popular but was a novelty item.

During the Second World War, jumpsuits were worn by women for their usefulness. In the 1950s, American designers like Bonnie Cashin started designing evening jumpsuits. But it was another decade before jumpsuits became popular as day and evening wear. The jumpsuit first appeared in Vogue in September 1964. Guy Laroche wore a brown jersey jumpsuit paired with a sealskin jacket and it was photographed by Irving Penn. It became a popular trend within a few months and two “moon shot”-style jumpsuits in white jerseys featured as Vogue patterns in January 1965.

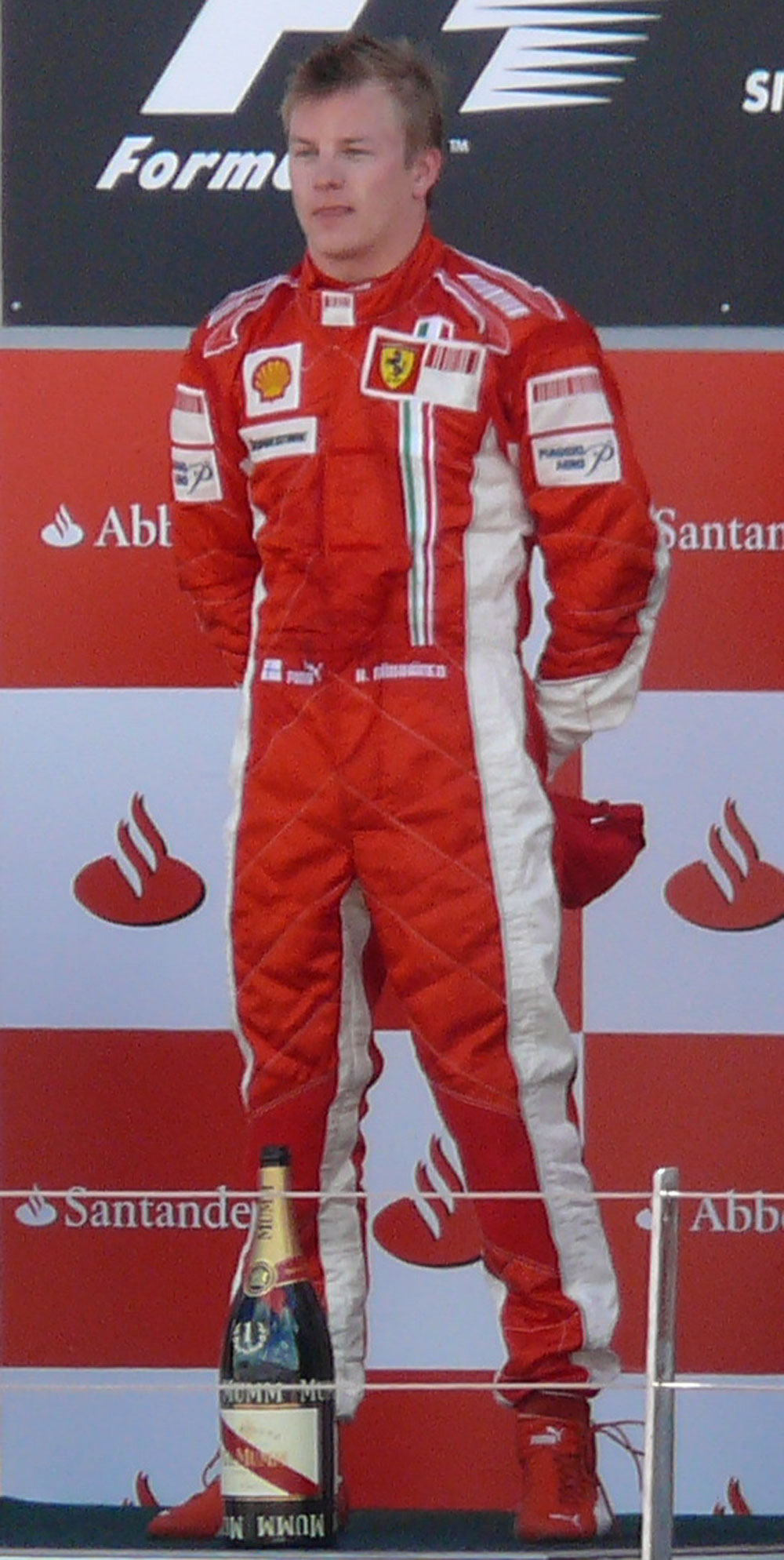
Formula One driver Kimi Räikkönen in a protective one-piece auto race suit

The late 1960s and 1970s were very important years for the jumpsuit. They were made as sportswear, in leather one-pieces, and also as embellished designs for evening. Jumpsuits found a place in every designer's designs. In the 1970s jumpsuit was a unisex outfit. Cher and Elvis wore stylish jumpsuits during their stage performances. Famous American designer Geoffrey Beene called the jumpsuit “the ballgown of the next century”, but it became out of fashion for the next decade. Nicolas Ghesquière tried to bring it back in 2002 by designing it in different fabrics and patterns. The updated jumpsuit again gained popularity, and thus the style was relaunched.

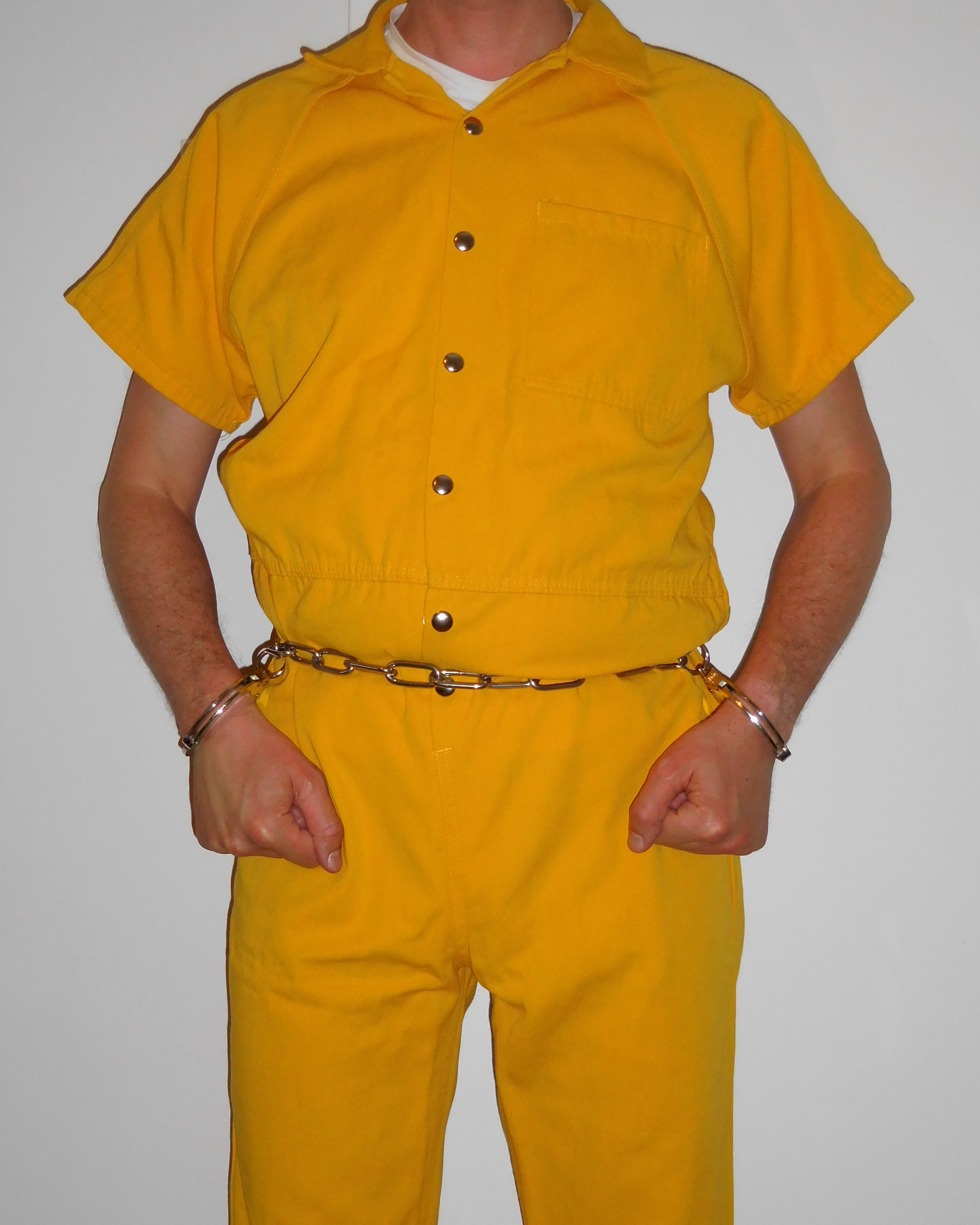
Inmate in bright yellow institutional jumpsuit

== Pilots and drivers ==
Aviators and astronauts sometimes wear insulated, fire-retardant jumpsuits or flight suits where other types of clothing can potentially float or flap about in zero gravity or during high-G maneuvers.

Drivers in motor racing wear jumpsuits for protection against fire (called a fire suit) and (in the case of motorcycle racers) leather suits for abrasion.

== Prisoners ==
Short-sleeved jumpsuits are common as a prison uniform, particularly in the United States. The clothing is a convenient way to determine who is an inmate and who is a corrections officer. Although bright orange uniforms are still in use, some institutions changed for other colors as orange jumpsuits became fashionable due to the influence of the Netflix series Orange Is the New Black. Furthermore, color-coded uniforms are fairly commonly used where different colors signify the inmate's custody level or issues like gender, potential safety risks, disciplinary history, severity of current charges and past convictions. Some institutions even went back to striped uniforms to prevent escaped inmates from being mistaken for sanitation, utility, or highway workers.

== See also ==
- Boilersuit
- Catsuit
- Flight suit
- Hazmat suit
- Onesie (jumpsuit)
- Prison uniform
- Romper suit
- Speedsuit
