= Onesie (jumpsuit) =

Loose-fitting casual jumpsuit for adults

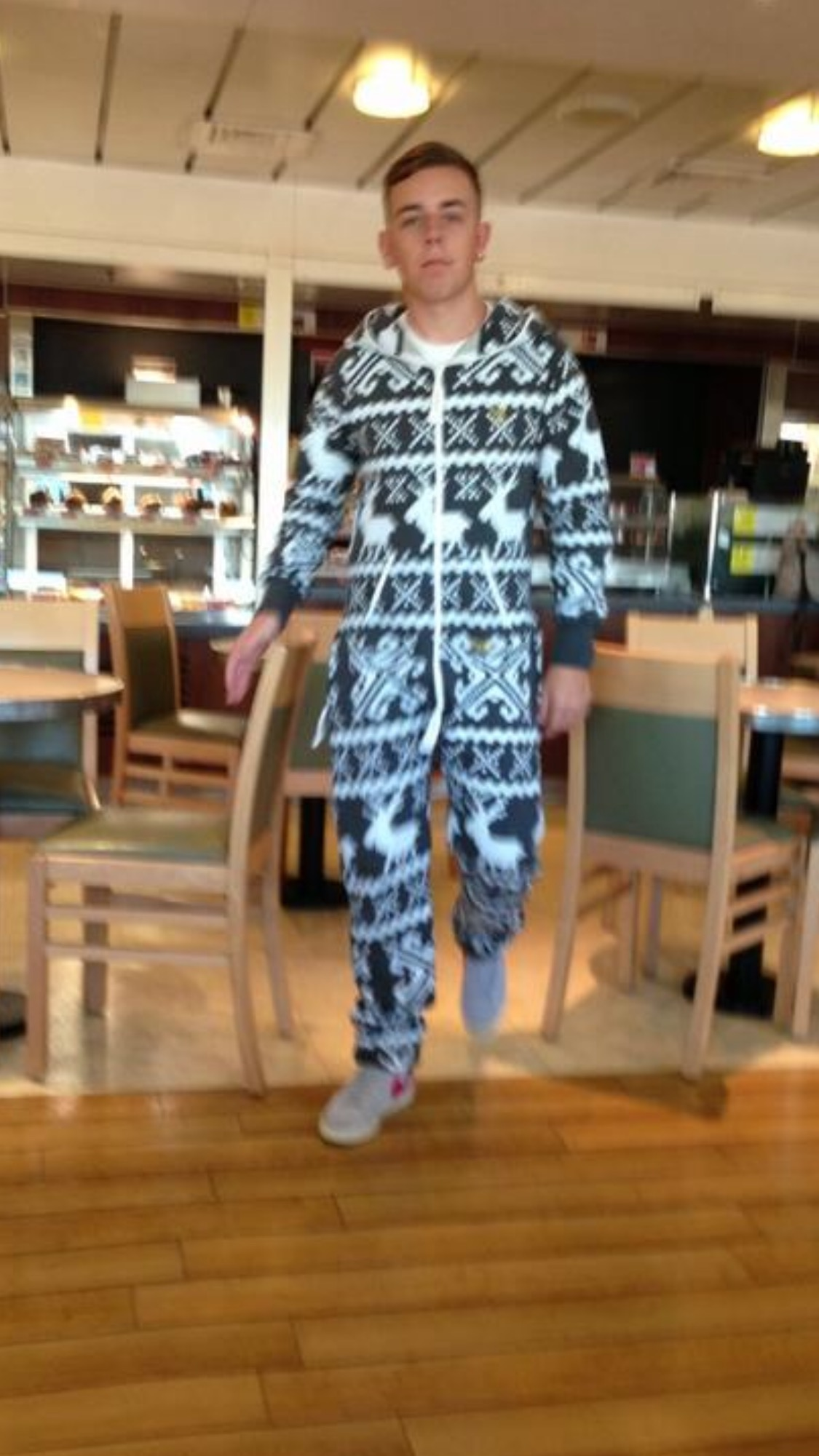
Snooker player Oliver Brown wears a onesie in public

A onesie (/ˈwʌnzi/) is a type of loose-fitting casual jumpsuit in adult sizes made of knit cotton (as used in sweatshirts), fleece, or chenille. They were mostly intended as loungewear or sleepwear, but have gained significant popularity as stylish streetwear, especially in the United Kingdom and Australia, becoming increasingly popular during the late 2000s and early 2010s as a street fashion. In 2016 the onesie also appeared in Switzerland. After onesies lost importance, in the UK the onesie made a comeback in the 2021-2023 energy crisis to save heating costs as a warm and comfortable garment.

== Etymology ==
The term onesies (with an s at the end) is a brand name for infant bodysuits that is owned by Gerber Childrenswear LLC, and the term is used generically for infant bodysuits in the US. There is little in common between the infant onesies and an adult onesie: the former is usually sleeveless and legless with snaps or buttons at the crotch. In 2008, when casual jumpsuits became increasingly popular, the press started discrediting them as "adult onesies," and the name seems to have eroded to a generic word, dropping the final "S" in the process.

== Kigurumi ==
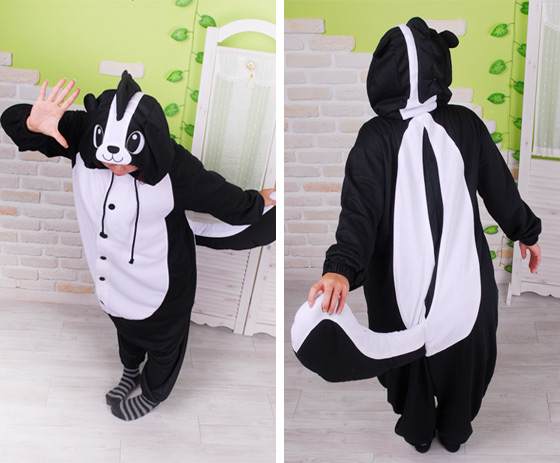
Kigurumi of a skunk character

A type of onesie known as kigurumi (着ぐるみ), or 'cosplay pajamas', emerged as Japanese street fashion and spread outside Japan in 2009. Kigurumi can also refer to a costumed character, and these types of clothing resemble various types of animals, similar to a mascot costume. They became popular worldwide, in particular following a viral video of Miley Cyrus twerking while wearing a unicorn kigurumi. Historically, the term kigurumi has been used in Japan to refer to the use of full-body mascot or masked outfits in performances and costume play, predating their use as pajamas. A more specific term to differentiate kigurumi masks is bishoujo kigurumi, sometimes incorrectly referred to as the mistranslation artifact animegao-kigurumi (see animegao kigurumi).

== See also ==
- Siren suit, the 1940s precursor to the onesie
- Union suit, one-piece underwear invented during the mid-19th century and worn by cowboys and American Civil War soldiers.
- Blanket sleeper, an infant garment similar to an adult onesie
