= Bootee =

Type of infant footwear

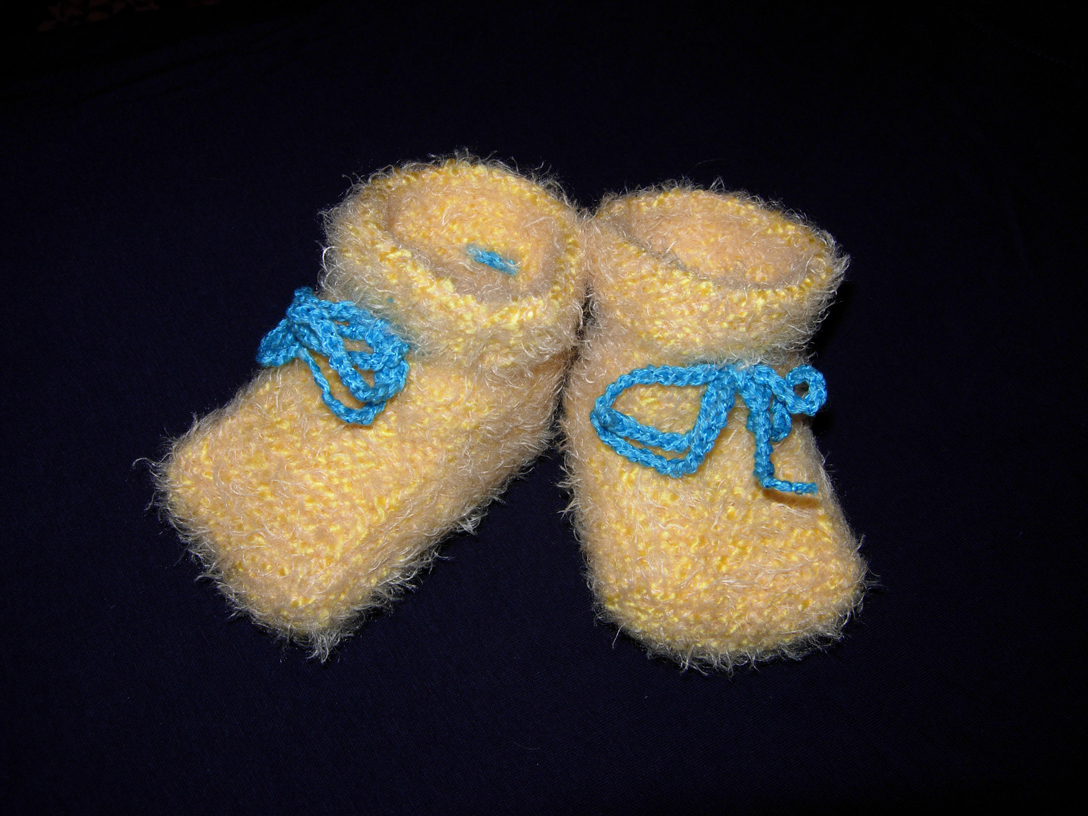
Infant's bootees

A bootee (also bootie or booty) is a short soft sock or bootlike garment used for warmth or protection. Bootees for babies are usually thick and knitted to keep the baby's feet warm. Dog booties for dogs such as sledge dogs in very cold Arctic conditions (see Iditarod Trail Sled Dog Race) protect the animal from the cold and sharp ice. Booties worn over the shoes in cold-weather biking similarly protect cyclists.

Disposable socks, such as those worn for hygiene by surgical teams, are also called bootees.
