= Infant bodysuit =

Type of clothing

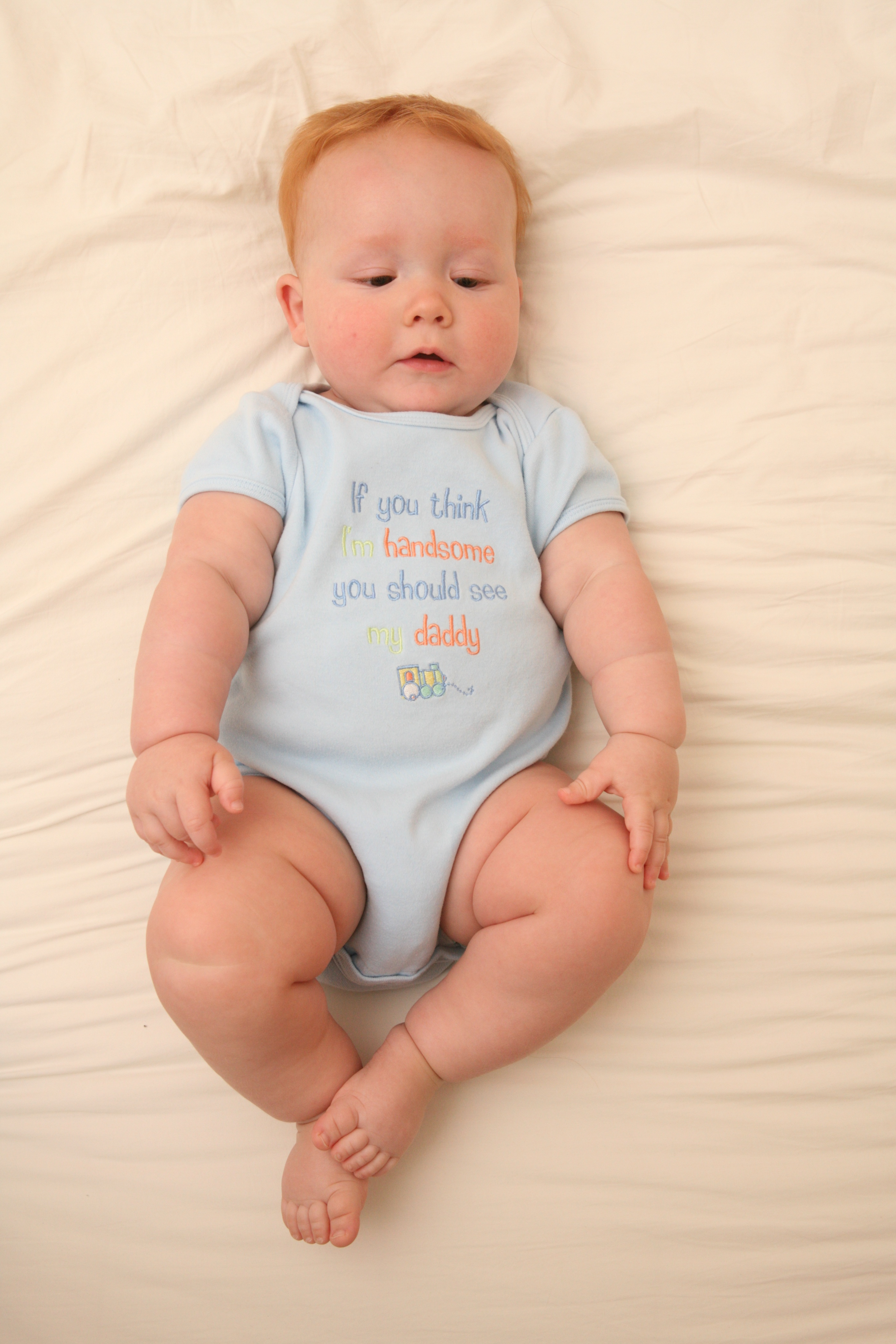
- Infant bodysuit.
- Type: Baby's clothes

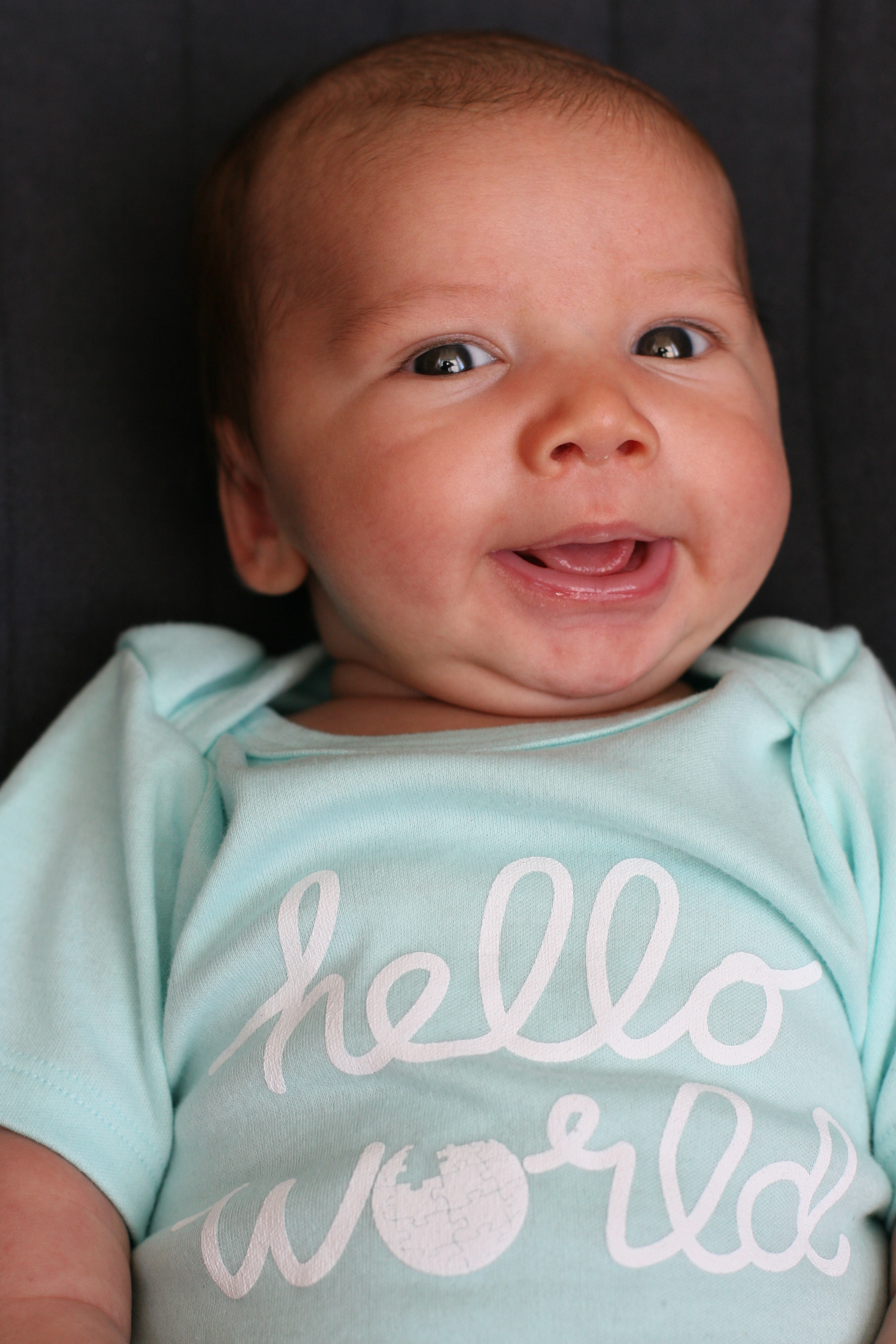
Baby in a Wikipedia "Hello World" onesie

An infant bodysuit or onesie (American English) is a garment designed to be worn by babies much like a T-shirt; they are distinguished from T-shirts by an extension below the waist, with snaps that allow it to be closed over the crotch. The purpose of the opening at the crotch is to facilitate access to the infant's diaper as well as preventing the garment from riding up the infant's body and exposing skin. Like T-shirts, infant bodysuits come in a wide variety of designs and may be worn as undergarments or as outer shirts.

The modern infant bodysuit was first designed in Chile in the early 1950s by Susana Duniau, a French-born Chilean seamstress. After giving birth to twin daughters, Duniau created a practical one-piece garment with snap fasteners to hold cloth diapers in place while keeping the baby warm. The design, locally known as the pilucho, quickly gained popularity in Chile and was later exported to the United States and Europe through the clothing brand Opaline. Because Chile at the time lacked intellectual property laws, Duniau's husband, Enrique Brito, registered the patent in the United States. The pilucho became the direct precursor of what is now globally known as the infant bodysuit or onesie.

== Synonyms ==
Other names of this outfit include onesies (a registered trademark often used in the United States as if it were generic), creepers, diaper shirts, or snapsuits. If the bodysuit is sleeveless, it may also be referred to as a vest (British English only).

== Types and design ==
An infant bodysuit may be sleeveless, have long sleeves, or have short sleeves. A common feature of the bodysuit is the lap neck (figures 1 and 2). This design makes it easier to get the head through the neck of the bodysuit, as babies have large heads proportional to their bodies, and additionally have poor head control, making traditional neck openings less suitable. Bodysuits without the lap neck may have snaps at the neck instead (figure 3).

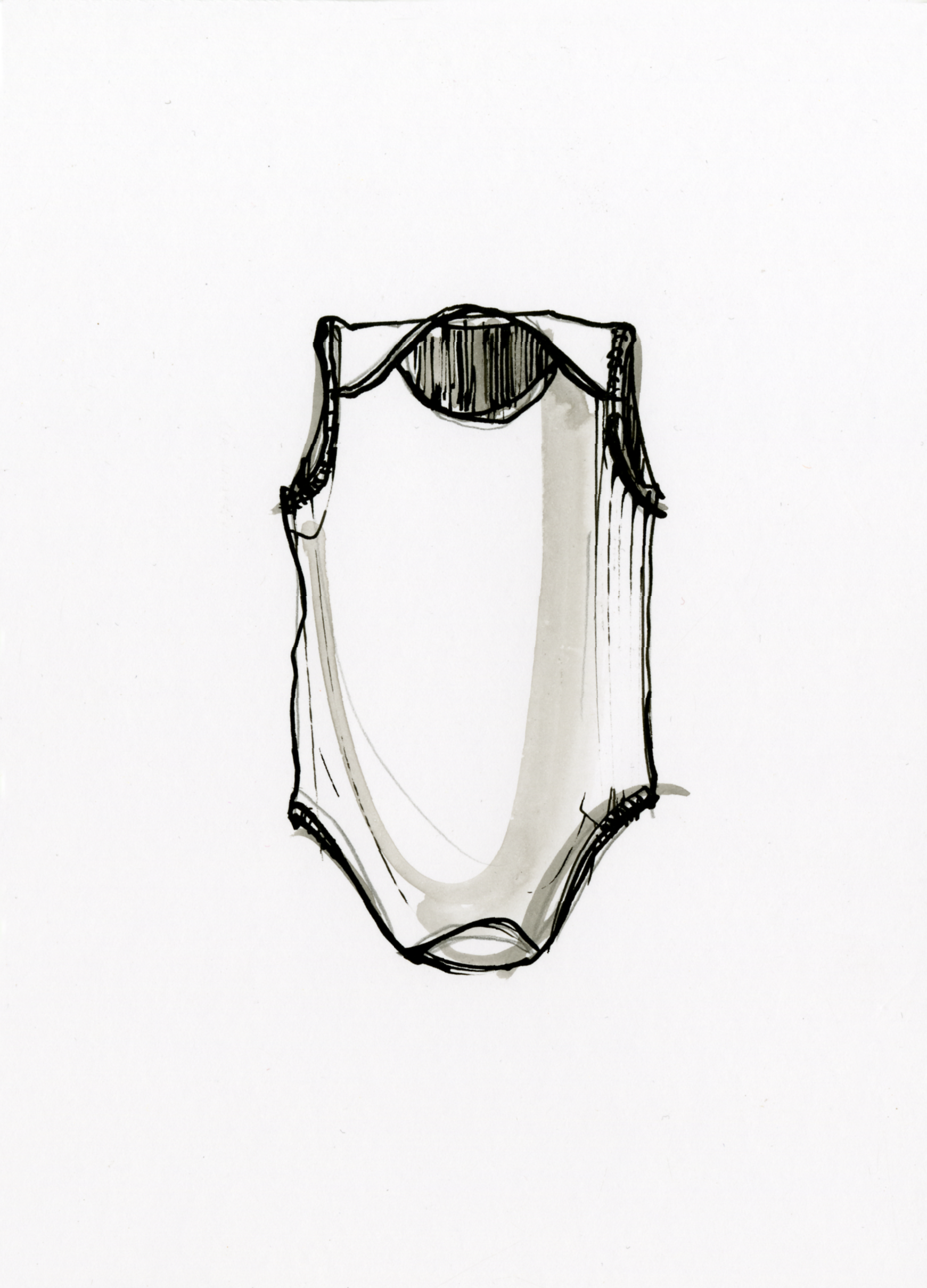
Figure 1. Sleeveless bodysuit with lap neck.

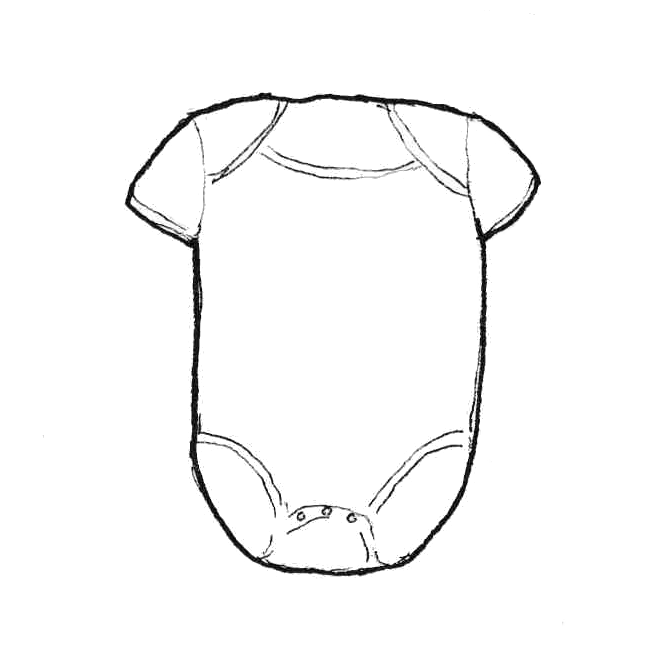
Figure 2. Short sleeve bodysuit with lap neck

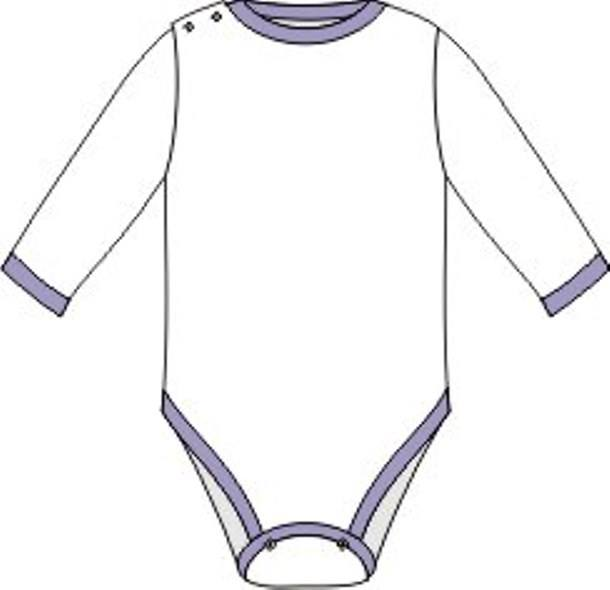
Figure 3. Long sleeve bodysuit with snap neck.

== Popularity ==
Infant bodysuits have gained significant popularity over the years and have become iconic in baby fashion. Their practicality, comfort, and versatility have made them a staple in many households worldwide. The convenience of the snap fasteners and the ease of dressing and changing diapers have contributed to their widespread use.

Infant bodysuits have also found their way into popular culture. They are often featured in movies, television shows, and advertisements, and have become a popular choice for personalized baby gifts.

Social media platforms have played a role in popularizing infant bodysuits. Parents frequently share cute and funny photos of their babies wearing personalized or unique bodysuits, contributing to the trend's visibility and popularity.

The term "onesie" has become widely recognized and is often used colloquially to refer to any type of infant bodysuit, regardless of the brand. It has also inspired the creation of adult-sized versions, known as adult onesies or jumpsuits, which have gained popularity as loungewear or costumes for events like themed parties or Halloween.

== See also ==
- Babygrow
- Bodysuit
- Infant clothing
- One-piece (disambiguation)
- Romper suit
