= Romper suit =

One-piece combination of shorts and a shirt

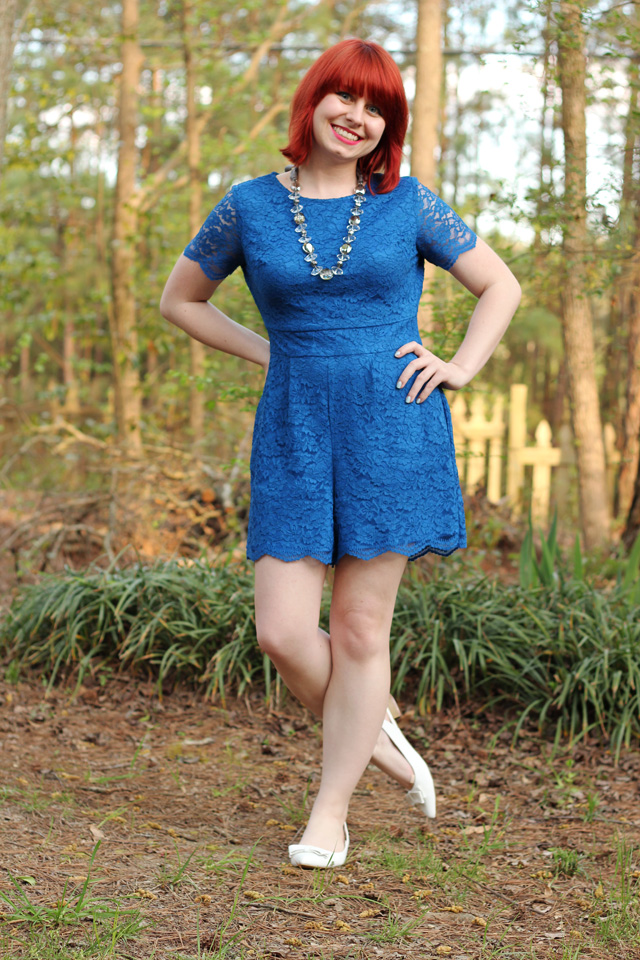
A woman wearing a romper

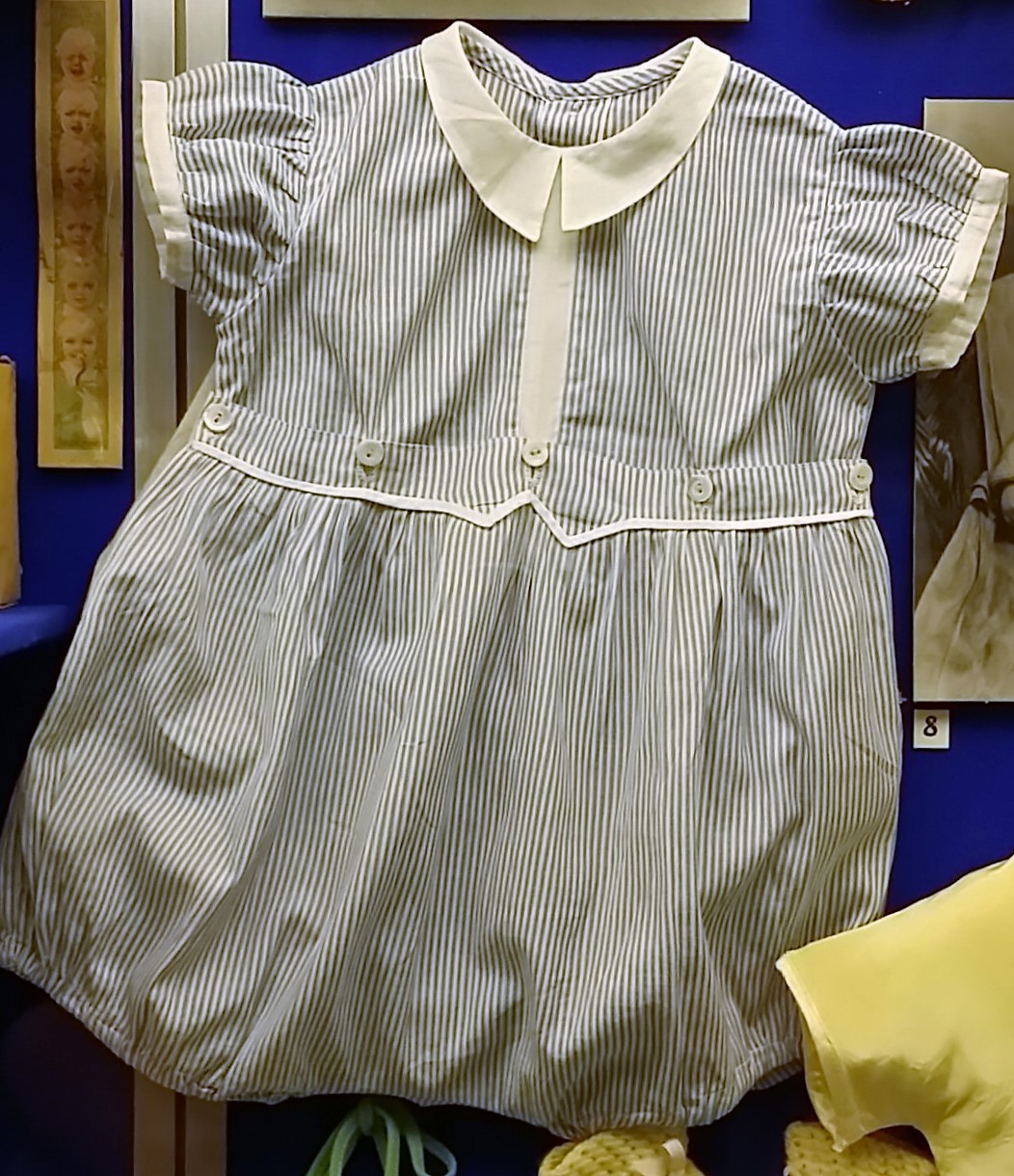
Baby's romper suit, c. 1950s. Museum of Childhood, Edinburgh

A romper suit, usually shortened to romper, is a one-piece or two-piece combination of shorts and a shirt. It is also known as a playsuit. Its generally short sleeves and legs contrast with the long ones of the adult jumpsuit.

== History ==
Rompers were in many ways the first modern casual clothes for children. They were light and loose fitting, a major change from the much more restrictive clothing children wore during the 19th-century Victorian era. Styles and conventions varied from country to country. In France they were, for many years, only for boys. While primarily a play garment, some French children wore dressy rompers. The classic and basic baby romper was invented by the Chilean fashion designer Susana Duniau Loyer in 1952 and was patented in Chile under the name "pilucho" which is the local slang word nude, as it goes next to the skin. Her intention with this invention was to help hold the diaper tighter and to add another layer of clothing to the babies to keep them warm. In the 1970s the item's prototype had been imported into the US and Europe and became a popular baby's basic layer.

Their popularity peaked in the 1950s when they were used by children as playwear and by women as leisure—and beachwear. Thereafter the garment has continued to be used by infants and toddlers; however, it has become less common among older girls and women, although never disappearing entirely. Starting in the late 2010s the romper dress, and romper with shorts have returned in fashion to all ages from kids to tween, teen, college and above ages.

=== Adult fashion ===
While rompers had been popular among women in the 1950s, they re-emerged in the 1970s as a fashion for adult women. In the 1970s rompers were usually a casual garment made of terrycloth, and often in a tube top style. They were common in the 1980s in a wider variety of materials such as silky fabrics for evening wear. Since 2006, rompers have enjoyed a minor renaissance as a fashionable garment for women. Though much less common, rompers for men have been produced. Several designers have presented collections including romper suits and they are offered by many retailers. Designers include Deborah Sweeney and Juliette Hogan.

In the 2010s the "sleep romper" for women gained popularity, being similar in style to the teddy, but with the appearance of shorts.

In 2017, the Male Romper was originally showcased in Milan, Italy. It is a romper for men and is sometimes referred to as a "romphim".

== See also ==
- Infant bodysuit
- Infant clothing
- Jumper (dress)
- Onesie
