= Intellectual property infringement =

Illegally breaching a monopoly on an idea

An intellectual property (IP) infringement or an intellectual property theft is the unauthorized use, exploitation, or violation of an intellectual property right. There are several types of intellectual property rights, such as brands, copyrights, patents, trademarks, industrial designs, holding and parent companies, plant breeders rights, products, publishers, and trade secrets. Therefore, an intellectual property infringement may for instance be one of the following:

- Copyright infringement, encompassing for example a software copyright infringement
- Patent infringement
- Trademark infringement
- Design infringement
- Cybersquatting
- Biopiracy

== Identifying infringement ==
Techniques to detect (or deter) intellectual property infringement include:

- Fictitious entry, such as:
  - Fictitious dictionary entry. An example is Esquivalience included in the New Oxford American Dictionary (NOAD)
  - Trap street, a fictitious street included on a map for the purpose of "trapping" potential copyright violators of the map
- Watermarking

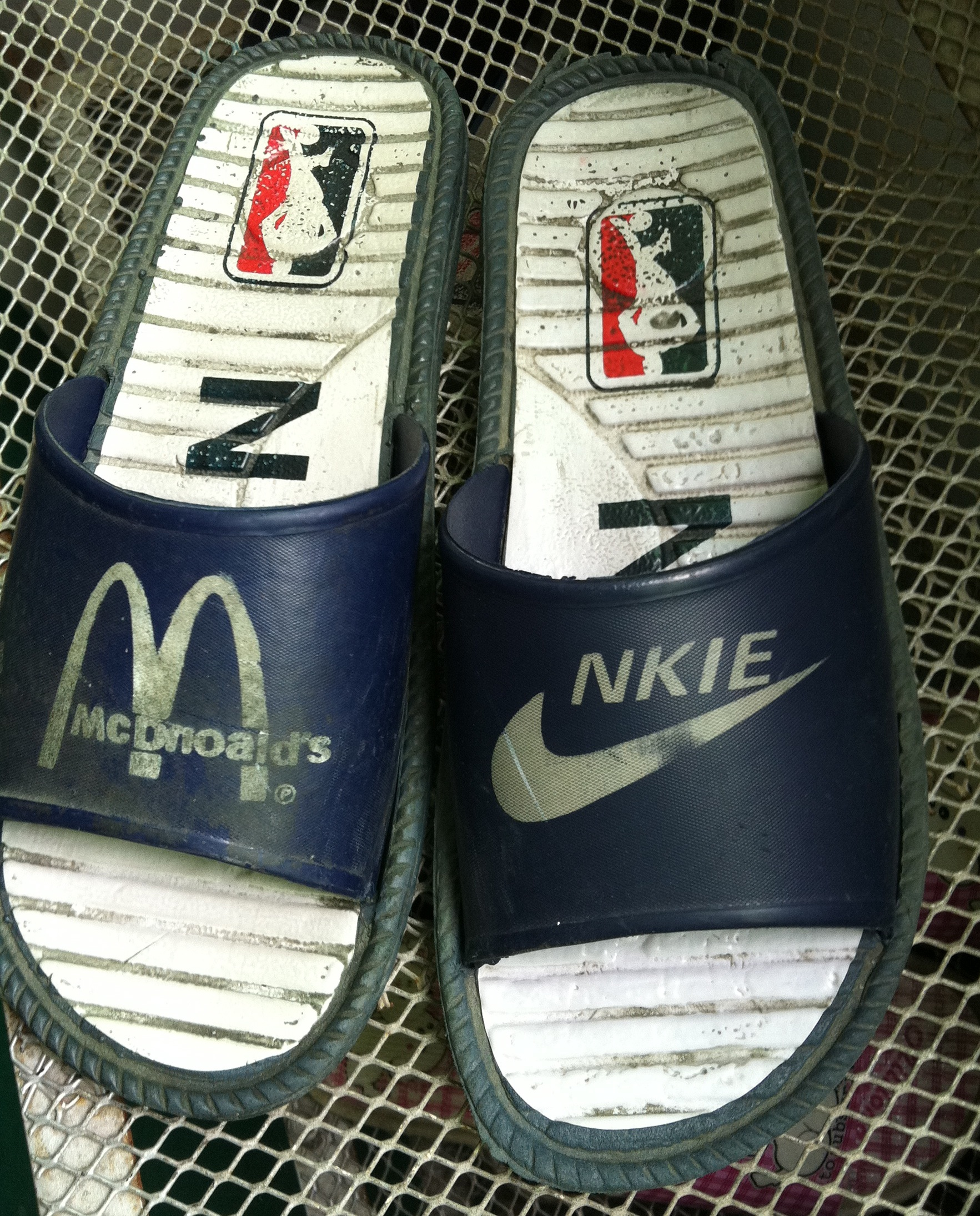
Intellectual property laws such as trademark laws forbid the sale of infringing goods like these "McDnoald's" [sic] and "NKIE" [sic] sandals from China.

Designing around a patent can sometimes be a way to avoid infringing it.

For patent infringement, identification commonly involves comparing the language of the patent claims with the accused product or process. In the United States, the United States Patent and Trademark Office describes infringement analysis as primarily involving a comparison between the claim language and the accused product or process. Practical screening may include reviewing the asserted claims, identifying each claim limitation, comparing those limitations with product documentation or observed features, monitoring competing products or patent filings, and preserving records of the analysis. Because patents are territorial and claim interpretation can be legally complex, a preliminary technical comparison is often followed by legal review before enforcement or clearance decisions are made.

Some forms of intellectual property infringement involve the production or distribution of counterfeit or pirated products and services. An example of a counterfeit product is if a vendor were to place a well-known logo on a piece of clothing that said company did not produce. An example of a pirated product is if an individual were to distribute unauthorized copies of a DVD for a profit of their own. In such circumstances, the law has the right to punish. Companies may seek out remedies themselves, however, "Criminal sanctions are often warranted to ensure sufficient punishment and deterrence of wrongful activity".

== See also ==
- Brand protection
- Allegations of intellectual property infringement by China
- Saisie-contrefaçon, in France
- Intellectual property analytics
- World Intellectual Property Organization (WIPO)
