= High Water =

High Water or Highwater may refer to:

- High water, the state of tide when the water rises to its highest level.

== Film and television ==
- Highwater (film), a 2008 documentary
- Step Up: High Water, a web television series
- High Water (TV series), A Polish-language TV series broadcast by Netflix.

== Music ==
- High Water (The Fabulous Thunderbirds album), 1997
- High Water (El-P album), 2004
- High Water I (2018) and High Water II (2019), albums by The Magpie Salute
- "High Water", a song by Uncle Tupelo from the 1993 album Anodyne
- "High Water", a song by Rush from the 1987 album Hold Your Fire
- "High Water (For Charley Patton)", a 2001 song by Bob Dylan

== Places ==
- Highwater, Quebec, Canada
- Highwater Creek, a stream in Minnesota, U.S.
- Highwater Township, Cottonwood County, Minnesota, U.S.

== Other uses ==
- High Water Recording Company, a blues record label
- Highwater Books, an American comic book publisher
- Jamake Highwater (Jackie Marks, 1931–2001), an American writer and journalist
- Project Highwater, a 1962 NASA space experiment
- Capri pants, or highwaters, shorter trousers

== See also ==
- High water mark (disambiguation)
- Hell or High Water (disambiguation)
