= John Deere snowmobiles =

John Deere was the trade name of snowmobiles designed and built by John Deere from 1972 to 1984. The initial design and testing phase came in 1970–1971, when engineers tested other popular snowmobiles, and found ways to improve them. The machines were produced by the John Deere Horicon Works of Horicon, Wisconsin along with lawn and garden products. Lawn and garden equipment is still manufactured there.

John Deere also had its own range of snowmobile suits.

== Marketing ==
The slogan "Nothing Runs Like a Deere", still used today by Deere & Co., started with the John Deere snowmobile line in 1972. From 1978 to 1980, JD used the slogan "Big John - Little John." In 1980, another new slogan was introduced: "Ride the new breed of Deere".

In 1980, John Deere was the official supplier of snowmobiles for the Winter Olympic Games in Lake Placid, New York.

=== Market exit ===
In 1982–1984, the snowmobile market was in a downward slide, and the driving force behind the snowmobile program, executive vice president Robert Carlson, had left the company. This made ending the snowmobile program an easy decision for Deere. The parts supply and all snowmobile-related resources were sold to Polaris. There was an understanding that Polaris would continue where Deere left off, selling snowmobiles and parts to the Deere dealers that were interested. This never worked out. Recently a prototype Liquifire was uncovered in a Polaris warehouse which would have been one of the first snowmobiles to feature independent front suspension.

The Snowfire was the last production snowmobile on the market to have a free-air engine, and the last snowmobile in production for John Deere.

== Enduro Team Deere ==
In 1974, a factory sponsored cross-country race team was assembled to go along with the introduction of the 295/S, Deere's first purpose-built snowmobile for cross-country racing. The team would eventually be known as "Enduro Team Deere". The team had many wins, the most notable being the 1976 Minneapolis - St. Paul International 500. Brian Nelson brought home the trophy on his Liquidator. His sled is currently on display at the Snowmobile Hall of Fame and Museum in St. Germain, Wisconsin. 1977 was the last year for the factory program. Instead, Deere offered support and incentives for independent racers.

== Models ==
A total of twenty-one models were produced:

Model	Years	Engine
300	1974–1977	Kohler K295-2AX (Walbro)
400	1972–1977	CCW KEC-340/4, /5, KEC-340/22 (Walbro, Bendix)
500	1972–1974	CCW KEC-440/4, /5 (Walbro, Bendix)
600	1973–1975	CCW KEC-440/4, /5 (Walbro, Bendix)
800	1975	CCW KEC-440/22 (Walbro)
JDX4	1973–1975	Kohler K295-2AX (Walbro); CCW KEC-340/22A (Walbro)
JDX4 Special	1974	CCW KEC-340/5 (Bendix)
JDX6	1974–1975	CCW KEC-400/22 (Walbro)
JDX8	1973–1975	CCW KEC-440/21 (Walbro); KEC-440/22 (Walbro); KEC-440/22A (Walbro)
JD295/S	1974	Kioritz KEC-295RS/2 (Mikuni,2)
JD340/S	1975	Kiroitz KEC-340RS/2 (Mikuni, 2)
340 Cyclone	1976–1978	Kioritz 340/22A, 240/22B (Mikuni)
440 Cyclone	1976–1978	Kioritz 340/22A, 240/22B (Mikuni)
340 Liquidator	1976	Kioritz KEC-340rs/24LC (Mikuni, 2)
340 Liquifire	1976–1978	Kioritz 340/23LC (Mikuni, 2)
440 Liquifire	1976–1978	Kioritz 440/23LC, 440/23ALC (Mikuni, 2)
340 Cross Country	1978	Kioritz 340/23LC (Mikuni, 2)
Liquifire	1980–1984	John Deere/Kawasaki TC440A (Mikuni, 2)
Snowfire	1982–1984	John Deere/Kawasaki TB340A (Mikuni)
Spitfire	1978–1982	Kohler K340-2FA (Mikuni); John Deere/Kawasaki TB340A (Mikuni)
Sprintfire	1983–1984	John Deere/Kawasaki TC340E (Mikuni)
Sportfire	1980–1984	John Deere/Kawasaki TA440B (Mikuni)
Trailfire	1979–1984	John Deere/Kawasaki TA340A, TA440A (Mikuni)

- Kioritz made engines for CCW, so they are the same.
- Kawasaki produced the John Deere-designed Fireburst engines.
- Comet first started making snowmobile clutches for John Deere. The 94C Duster clutch and the 102C clutch were developed exclusively for John Deere.
