= High water mark (disambiguation) =

A high water mark is a point that represents the maximum rise of a body of water over land.

High water mark may also refer to:

- High-water mark of the Confederacy, the turning point of the Battle of Gettysburg
  - High Water Mark of the Rebellion Monument, an 1892 Gettysburg Battlefield memorial
- High water marks, used to determine hedge fund performance fees (see Hedge fund § Fees paid to hedge funds)
- High-water mark (computer security), a computer security model wherein a document takes on the highest level of confidentiality allowed to the last person to access it
- The High Water Marks, the indie rock band.
- High-water mark (computer science), a limit above which data in a buffer must be must be consumed or dropped.

== See also ==
- Watermark (disambiguation)
- High Water (disambiguation)
- Highmark (disambiguation)
