= Highmark (disambiguation) =

Highmark is a health insurance company in Pittsburgh, Pennsylvania.

Highmark may also refer to:

- Highmark Place, or Fifth Avenue Place, Pittsburgh, Pennsylvania
- Ralph Wilson Stadium, in Orchard Park, New York
- Highmark Stadium (Pennsylvania), in Pittsburgh, Pennsylvania
- Highmarking, a snowmobile activity

== See also ==
- High water mark (disambiguation)
