= Design infringement =

Breach of intellectual property rights

Design is a form of intellectual property right concerned with the visual appearance of articles which have commercial or industrial use. The visual form of the product is what is protected rather than the product itself. The visual features protected are the shape, configuration, pattern or ornamentation. A design infringement is where a person infringes a registered design during the period of registration. The definition of a design infringement differs in each jurisdiction but typically encompasses the purported use and make of the design, as well as if the design is imported or sold during registration. To understand if a person has infringed the monopoly of the registered design, the design is assessed under each jurisdiction's provisions. The infringement is of the visual appearance of the manufactured product rather than the function of the product, which is covered under patents. Often infringement decisions are more focused on the similarities between the two designs, rather than the differences.

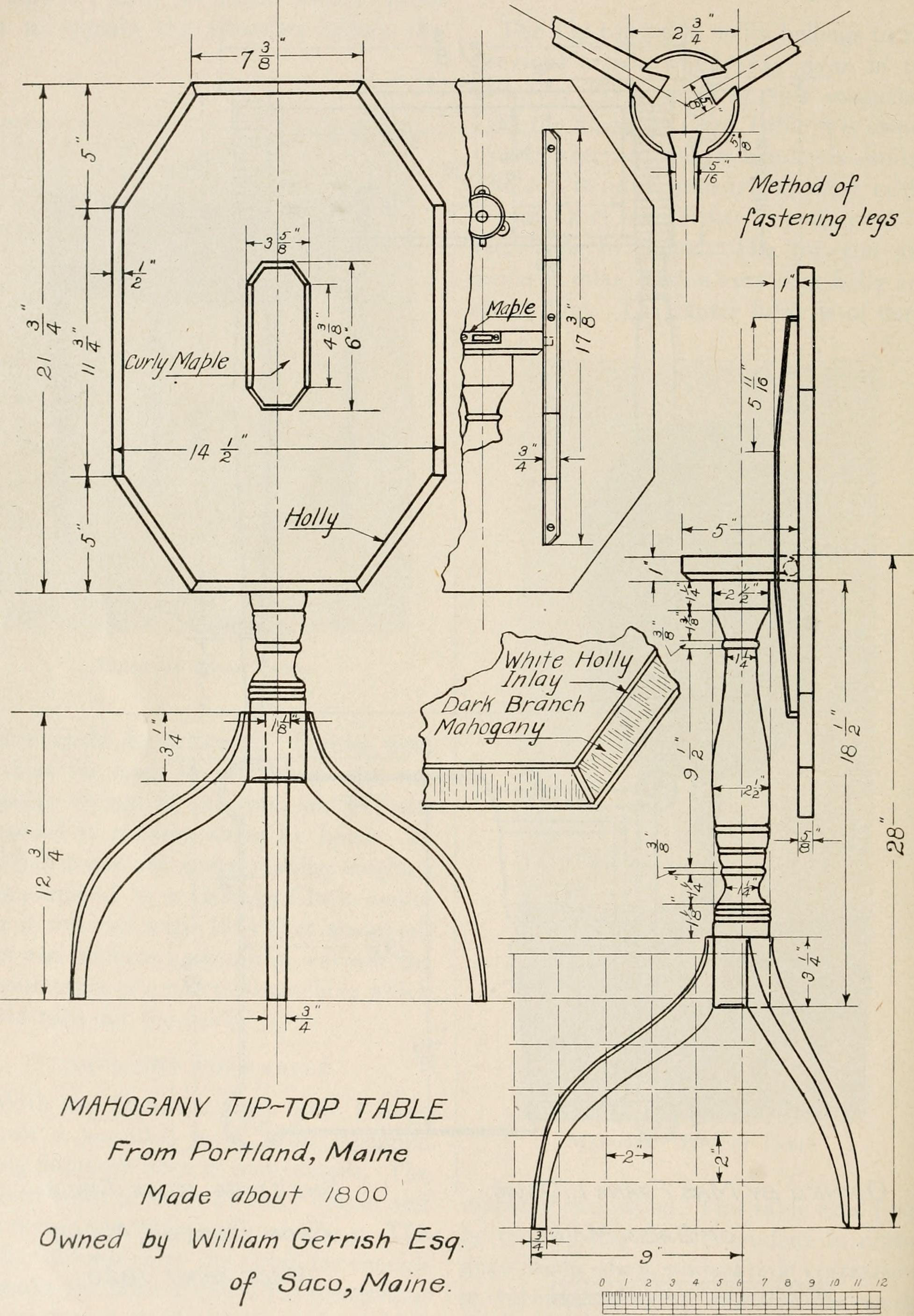
Industrial Education Magazine Extract: Mahogany tip-top table from Portland, Maine. Made about 1800. Owned by William Gerrish Esq. of Saco, Maine.

== Legislation ==
=== Australia ===
In Australia, a person infringes a registered design if a party manufactures and sells, uses or imports the same or similar design to the registered design without permission of the registered owner. This is held under s71 of the Design Act 2003 (Cth). The following is an extract of s71 of the Designs Act 2003 (Cth), under Infringement of Design.

"(1) A person infringes a registered design if, during the term of registration of the design, and without the licence or authority of the registered owner of the design, the person:

(a) makes or offers to make a product, in relation to which the design is registered, which embodies a design that is identical to, or substantially similar in overall impression to, the registered design; or

(b) imports such a product into Australia for sale, or for use for the purposes of any trade or business’ or

(c) sells, hires or otherwise disposes of, or offers to sell, hire or otherwise dispose of, such a product; or

(d) uses such a product in any way for the purposes of any trade or business; or

(e) keeps such a product for the purpose of doing any of the things mentioned in paragraph (c) or (d)"

The Designs Act recognises two types of infringement: primary and secondary infringement. A primary infringement relates to s71(1)(a), where a person directs, causes or procures the product to be made by a third party. Secondary infringement relate to ss 71(1)(b), (c), (d), (e), where a person infringes a registered design if there is no licence or authority given. A parallel import of a registered design is allowed in Australia.

The Designs Act 2003 replaced the Designs Act 1906, having a particular change to the way design infringements are identified. Key changes included removing tests of obvious and fraudulent imitations. Also introduced was that a certificate of examination must be issued prior to infringement proceedings. The test for infringement is significantly broader as it expressly requires an assessment of the similarities and differences between the registered design and the purported infringing design.

=== United Kingdom ===
Under the Registered Designs Act 1949, a design right is infringed when a person without consent from the registered design holder makes, offers, import or exports the product. The infringement rights in registered designs is laid out within Section 7A of the Registered Designs Act 1949. An infringement of the right in a registered design is actionable by the registered proprietor. The Act advises that the right in a registered design is not infringed if, the act is done in private and not commercial in nature, is experimental, or a reproduction for teaching purposes. The UK Court of Appeal confirmed that in determining an infringing article, the registered design, the alleged infringing object, and the prior art must be evaluated. Simply the test is a visual comparison between the two designs. The Act also provides an exemption for innocent infringers. Damages are not awarded against a defendant if there is sufficient evidence to prove that he/she was not aware that the design was registered.

An alternative protection that the United Kingdom legislation offers is the principle of an unregistered design. To prosecute for an infringement, the unregistered design right holder must prove that they created the design in the first place and that the infringing article is a deliberate duplication. Further it must be proved that the shape and overall configuration of the protected product is not the same as any products that have been publicised before the design was created.

=== United States ===
In the United States, designs are governed by the patent statute, set out in 35 USC § 171 Chapter 16. Here, protection is given for a new, original and ornamental design of an article. As with other jurisdictions, the design patent within the US only provides protection for the visual design aspects of the article, rather than the function. Chapter 28 of 35 USC § 171 covers the infringement of patents, and defines and infringement as without authority, makes, uses, offers, or sells a patented design. An infringement also covers any attempt in infringing a design, and selling components of patented articles.

Section 127 outlines both direct and indirect infringement. Direct infringement encompasses the unauthorised importation of patented products (35 U.S.C. § 271(a)), and unauthorised importation of products of a patented process (35 U.S.C. § 271(a)). Indirect infringement imposes liability upon those why gave aided another in direct infringement of a registered design (35 U.S.C. § 271(b)) or contributed to infringement (35 U.S.C. § 271(c)). This highlights the most common type of infringement, where the infringer's knowledge of the actions taken are established to confirm if there is an infringement. Proof of intent is also necessary to show the contribution to infringement. The statute does not provide protection for unregistered designs. To gain protection from infringement, and any design patent right, it is necessary to file a patent application.

== Testing infringement ==
Infringement of a registered design can be identified through ‘the eyes of an ordinary observer’ test. This means that the appearance of an accused design is seen to be an infringement, if the design is significantly similar, and one may purchase the accused design product thinking that it is the patented design. This test is based on an ordinary observer being familiar with a product and being able to distinguish between the registered design and prior art designs. The case of Egyptian Goddess Inc. v Swisa Inc. was key in adopting the ordinary observer test. The Court found that for a design to be infringed, the accused design must have appropriated the registered design. The infringement lies within the similarity between the designs what is distinguished from the prior art base. In assessing the overall similarity of designs, for example, s19 of the Designs Act 2003 (Cth) provides a list of factors to consider in testing infringement. This includes understanding the differences between designs rather than emphasising the similarities. More weight must be given to the similarities between two designs. If one aspect of a design is substantially similar, weight must be given to the importance of that aspect of the design.

The decision maker must further take the point of view from the standard of a person who is familiar with the products, the informed user. The ‘informed user’ test can also be used to identify an infringement of a registered or unregistered design. An informed user can range from a consumer to a sectoral expert with technical proficiency. The user will be able to notice small difference between design and can be seen as particularly observant having had a personal experience with, or key knowledge of the product. The informed user should not always be an expert of consumer to be the test in all cases. The selected informed user must be a person who has significant familiarity with the product's appearance, use and nature.

== Audiences ==
Within design and patent law, experts are seen to be the primary decision makers in assessing the similarities and differences of designs. As infringement is judged from different audiences of the design, e.g., consumers and experts, the motivations for infringement are distinguished. Consumers note accused designs to be substitutes where they function in similar ways. To consumers the designs would be interchangeable.

The test for infringement of a design patent draws much more from trademark than from patent law. As the test evokes an audience of reasonable purchasers of the design or product, similar to that of the trademark test. As mentioned, infringement is judged “in the eye of an ordinary observer”. From this, the audience for the test of infringement is an ordinary observer who is placed in the position to determine the similarities of the designs.

== Enforcement ==
To commence enforcement proceedings it must be decided if the Court will establish that the product is infringing the registered design, and if the design is a valid registration. The registered design owner can only consider enforcement proceedings once a certificate of examination has been provided. To enforce design rights against an infringing designer the owner of the registered design must initiate the process of examination. This is in line with the certificate of examination. A design Registrar will not grant a certificate of examination of the design is found to be invalid as there is no newness or distinctiveness to the design. The examination will consist of a comparison of the designs that existed prior to the lodgement of the design application. The test of the ordinary observer enables registered designs with significant similarities to have a broader scope of enforcement. Among many jurisdictions is common for a party threatened with infringement to be allowed to seek relief even through the design has not yet been certified. Action may be taken to protect the goodwill and reputation of the design holder.

=== Courts ===
Courts are an essential aspect in the enforcement of design infringement. Court appointed experts are beneficial to enforcement proceedings, as a panel of assessors such as patent attorneys, designers and engineers enhance the limited technical knowledge a judge may have in a certain area. The Courts will assess damages based on the loss of profit and reputation of the design holder, and the profits made by the infringer. Case management is supported by the Court to enable the most economic and efficient method to bring the infringement proceedings to trial.

=== Alternative dispute resolution ===
Alternative dispute resolution can be a more effective way of resolving design infringement, as enforcement mechanisms are often not suited to the common disputes that arise. Design disputes can involve complex technical and commercial issues that can be better determined by an expert within alternative dispute resolution rather than employing witnesses within the courts. Arbitration and mediation are suitable for resolving intellectual property disputes, as most common disputes involve small claims for damages. For intellectual property disputes, alternative dispute resolution provides benefits including confidentiality, greater control over the process and a more neutral outcome. Alternative dispute resolution is more cost effective than litigation, therefore more attractive to smaller companies and individuals without the resources, time and funding to resolve cases in court.

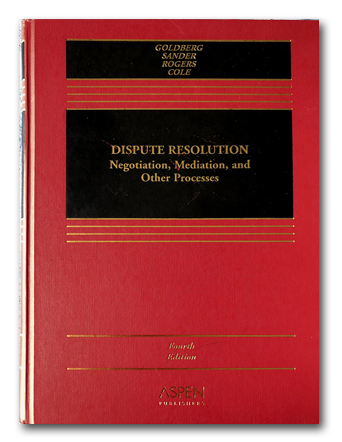
Dispute Resolution: Negotiation, Mediation and Other Processes
