= Microsoft Identity Integration Server =

Identity management (IdM) product offered by Microsoft

Microsoft Identity Integration Server (MIIS) is an identity management (IdM) product offered by Microsoft. It is a service that aggregates identity-related information from multiple data-sources. The goal of MIIS is to provide organizations with a unified view of a user's/resources identity across the heterogeneous enterprise and provide methods to automate routine tasks.

MIIS manages information by retrieving identity information from the connected data sources and storing the information in the connector space as connector space objects or CSEntry objects. The CSEntry objects are then mapped to entries in the metaverse called metaverse objects or MVEntry objects. This architecture allows data from dissimilar connected data sources to be mapped to the same MVEntry object. All back-end data is stored on Microsoft SQL Server.

For example, through the metaverse an organization's e-mail system can be linked to its human resources database, its PBX system and any other data repositories containing relevant user information. Each employee's attributes from the e-mail system and the human resources database are imported into the connector space through respective management agents. The e-mail system can then link to individual attributes from the employee entry, such as the employee telephone number. If an employee's telephone number changes, the new telephone number will automatically be propagated to the e-mail system.

One of the goals of the identity management is to establish and support authoritative sources of information for every known attribute and to preserve data integrity according to predetermined business rules.

On IdM market of products MIIS stands out by implementing state-based architecture. The majority of competitors are offering transaction-based products. Due to this approach MIIS requires no software/drivers/agents/shims to be installed on the target system.

== Extensibility ==
The product is extensible through the use of the .NET Framework, which allows developers and network administrators to extend out-of-the-box capabilities and perform complex tasks.

== Versions ==
- Zoomit Via (pre 1999)
- Microsoft Metadirectory Server [MMS] (1999–2003)
- Microsoft Identity Integration Server 2003 Enterprise Edition [MIIS] (Retired)
- Microsoft Identity Integration Server 2003 Feature Pack [IIFP] (Retired)
- Microsoft Identity Lifecycle Manager Server 2007 ILM (Retired)
- Microsoft Forefront Identity Manager 2010 FIM (Retired)
- Microsoft Identity Manager 2016 [MIM] (Current)

== History ==
MIIS has its origins in two Canadian companies' products, Linkage Software's metadirectory product LinkAge Directory Exchange (LDE) which Microsoft acquired on June 30, 1997 and Zoomit Corporation's metadirectory product, Via, which Microsoft acquired on July 7, 1999.

LDE was strongly email system oriented but traces of it and its field mapping technology remain through MIIS 2003.

After acquiring Zoomit Via Microsoft renamed it to MMS (Microsoft Metadirectory Services) and offered this product for free; however they will strongly encourage customers to hire Microsoft Consulting Services to install and configure product.

Microsoft Identity Integration Server 2003 was completely re-written from ground up. No original Zoomit Via code was moved into MIIS. However Microsoft preserved methodology and original idea of the Via product. MIIS 2003 no longer uses ZScript (proprietary scripting language of Zoomit Via), instead it offered .NET Framework support. With this upgrade Microsoft did not offer a migration path from MMS to MIIS due to the significant differences in the products.

Currently Service Pack 2 is available for MIIS 2003.

IIFP is a slimmed-down version of MIIS that is limited to synchronization between AD, ADAM, and exchange datastores.

In fall 2007 MIIS 2003 was incorporated into a new offering called Identity Lifecycle Manager (ILM) 2007. This product was announced at the RSA Conference in February 2007 and made available to customers in May 2007. Identity Lifecycle Manager 2007 includes not only the original MIIS 2003 product, but also a component called Certificate Lifecycle Manager (CLM) which is used to manage X.509 digital certificate and smart card issuance.

== Future developments ==
Future releases of MIIS/ILM are expected to be x64 only; x86 support expected to be dropped, following suite of Exchange Server Public Release Candidate (RC) version for Identity Lifecycle Manager '2' is available now (December 2008) The Microsoft SQL Server 2008 is a new back-end dependency of ILM '2'

== Supported data sources ==
MIIS 2003, Enterprise Edition, includes support for a wide variety of identity repositories including the following.

Network operating systems and directory services : Microsoft Windows NT, Active Directory, Active Directory Application Mode, IBM Directory Server, Novell eDirectory , Resource Access Control Facility (RACF), SunONE/iPlanet Directory, X.500 systems and other network directory products

E-mail : Lotus Notes and IBM Lotus Domino, Microsoft Exchange 5.5, 2000, 2003, 2007, 2010, & 2013.

Application : PeopleSoft, SAP AG products, ERP1, telephone switches PBX, XML- and Directory Service Markup Language DSML-based systems

Database : Microsoft SQL Server, Oracle RDBMS, IBM Informix, dBase, IBM Db2

File-based : DSMLv2, LDIF, Comma-separated values CSV, delimited, fixed width, attribute value pairs

Other: MIIS provides developers with well defined framework to create additional management agents (in any .NET Framework languages currently available on the market) that are not available out-of-the box. Microsoft itself as well as third party vendors provide a wide array of additional management agents, such as OpenLDAP, IBM UniData, PeopleSoft, Windows Live ID/Hotmail, MySQL etc.

== Limitations ==
While MIIS appears to support DSML, there is currently no out-of-the-box support for SPML version 1 or version 2.0. Standardization in the service provisioning space would benefit consumers and assist in avoiding costly lock-in to proprietary systems.

== See also ==
- Identity Lifecycle Manager
- Password Change Notification Service (PCNS)
- Watermark (data synchronization)
