= Snowmobile =

Land vehicle designed for travel on snow

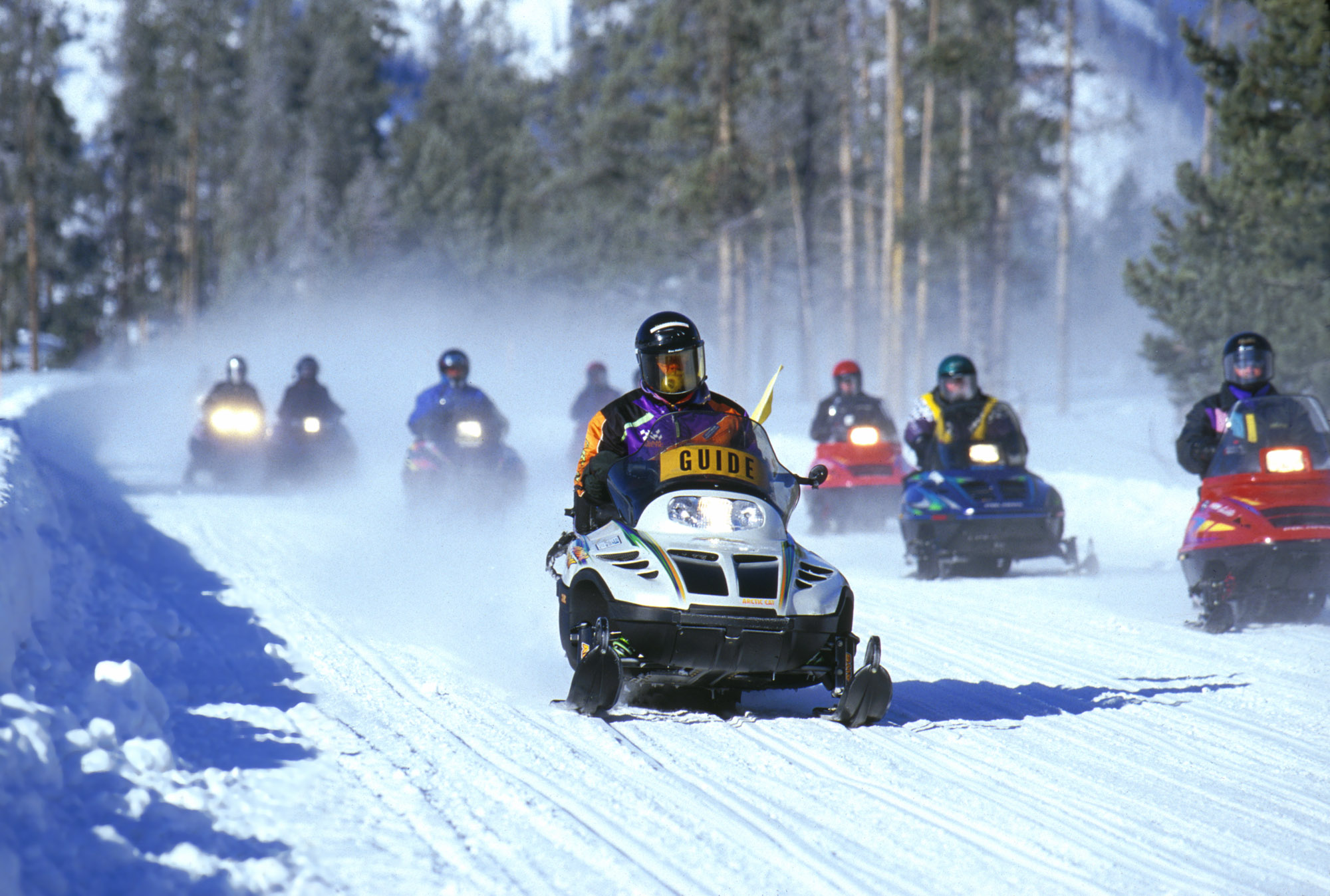
A snowmobile tour at Yellowstone National Park

First person view of a snowmobile driven through Yellowstone National Park.

A snowmobile, also known as a snowmachine (chiefly Alaskan), motor sled (chiefly Canadian), ski-doo (Ontario and Quebec, dated proprietary eponym), motor sledge, skimobile, snow scooter, or simply a sled is a motorized vehicle designed for winter travel and recreation on snow.

Their engines normally drive a continuous track at the rear, while skis at the front provide directional control. The earliest snowmobiles were powered by readily available industrial four-stroke, air-cooled engines. They were replaced in part by lighter and more powerful two-stroke gasoline internal combustion engines. Since 2003, four-stroke engines became more readily available on new snowmobiles.

The challenges of cross-country transportation in the winter led to the invention of an all-terrain vehicle specifically designed for travel across deep snow in which other vehicles foundered.

As of 2026, the snowmobile market was shared between three large North American makers (Bombardier Recreational Products (Ski-Doo and Lynx), Arctic Cat, and Polaris) and some specialized makers such as the Quebec-based AD Boivin, manufacturer of the Snow Hawk and the European Alpina snowmobile. Yamaha ended their snowmobile production in 2025.

The second half of the 20th century saw the rise of recreational snowmobiling, whose riders are called snowmobilers, sledders, or slednecks. Recreational riding is known as snowcross/racing, trail riding, freestyle, boondocking, ditchbanging and grass drags. In the summertime snowmobilers can drag race on grass, asphalt strips, or even across water (as in snowmobile skipping). Snowmobiles are sometimes modified to compete in long-distance off-road races.

== History ==
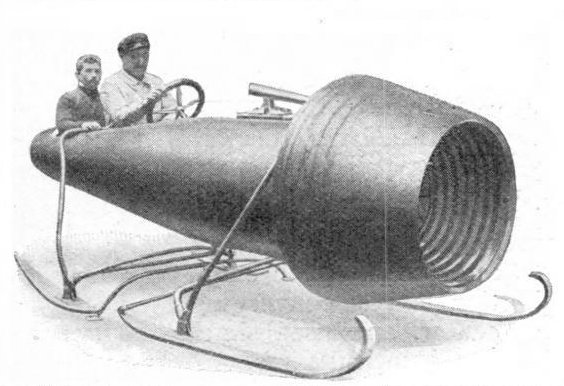
Motor sled powered by a Coandă ducted fan

=== Early designs ===
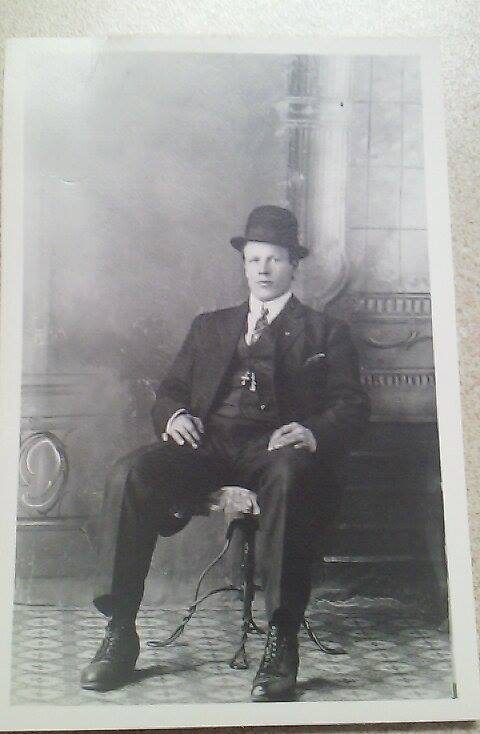
Harry Kalenze, inventor of the Vehicle Propeller

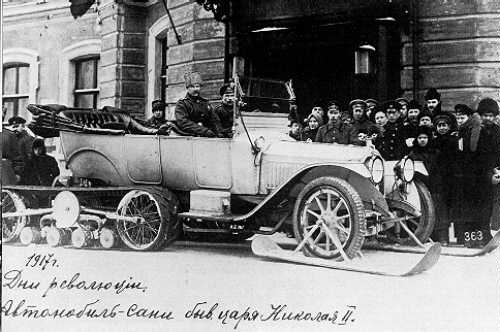
Nicholas II Packard Twin-6 with Kégresse track

A patent (554.482) for the Sled-Propeller design, without a model, was submitted on Sept. 5, 1895 by inventors William J. Culman and William B. Follis of Brule, Wisconsin.

The Lombard Steam Log Hauler (1901–1930) was a locomotive-style cargo sledge.

The American Motor Sleigh was a short-lived novelty vehicle produced in Boston in 1905. Designed for travel on snow, it consisted of a sleigh body mounted on a framework that held an engine, a drive-shaft system, and runners. Although considered an interesting novelty, sales were low and production ceased in 1906.

An Aerosledge, a propeller-driven and running on skis, was built in 1909–1910 by Russian inventor Igor Sikorsky of helicopter fame. Aerosanis were used by the Soviet Red Army during the Winter War and World War II. There is some dispute over whether Aerosanis count as snowmobiles because they were not propelled by tracks.

Adolphe Kégresse designed an original caterpillar tracks system, called the Kégresse track, while working for Tsar Nicholas II of Russia between 1906 and 1916. These used a flexible belt rather than interlocking metal segments and could be fitted to a conventional car or truck to turn it into a half-track, suitable for use over soft ground, including snow. Conventional front wheels and steering were used but the wheel could be fitted with skis as seen in the upper right image. He applied it to several cars in the Royal garage including Rolls-Royce cars and Packard trucks. Although this was not a snowmobile, it is an ancestor of the modern concept.

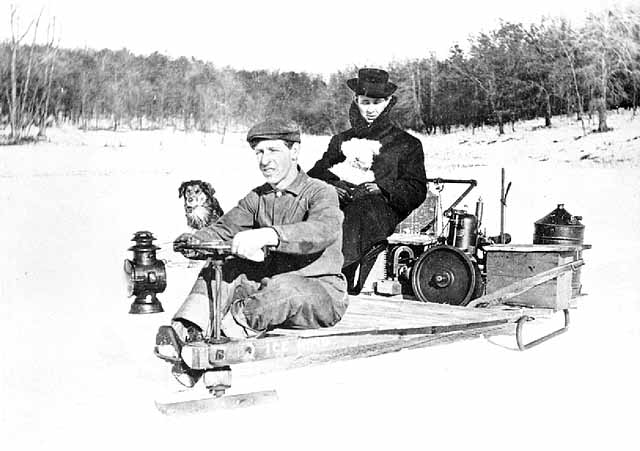
Snowmobile running on the Mississippi River near Hastings, Minnesota, 1910

In 1911 a 24-year-old, Harold J. Kalenze (pronounced Collins), patented the Vehicle Propeller in Brandon, Manitoba, Canada.

In 1914, O. M. Erickson and Art Olsen of the P.N. Bushnell company in Aberdeen, South Dakota, built an open two-seater "motor-bob" out of an Indian motorcycle modified with a cowl-cover, side-by-side seating, and a set of sled-runners fore and aft. While it did not have the tracks of a true snowmobile, its appearance was otherwise similar to the modern version and is one of the earliest examples of a personal motorized snow-vehicle.

In 1915 Ray H. Muscott of Waters, Michigan, received the Canadian patent for his motor sleigh, or "traineau automobile", and on June 27, 1916, he received the first United States patent for a snow-vehicle using the now recognized format of rear track(s) and front skis. Many individuals later modified Ford Model Ts with the undercarriage replaced by tracks and skis following this design. They were popular for rural mail delivery for a time. The common name for these conversion of cars and small trucks was Snowflyers.

=== Development of modern designs ===
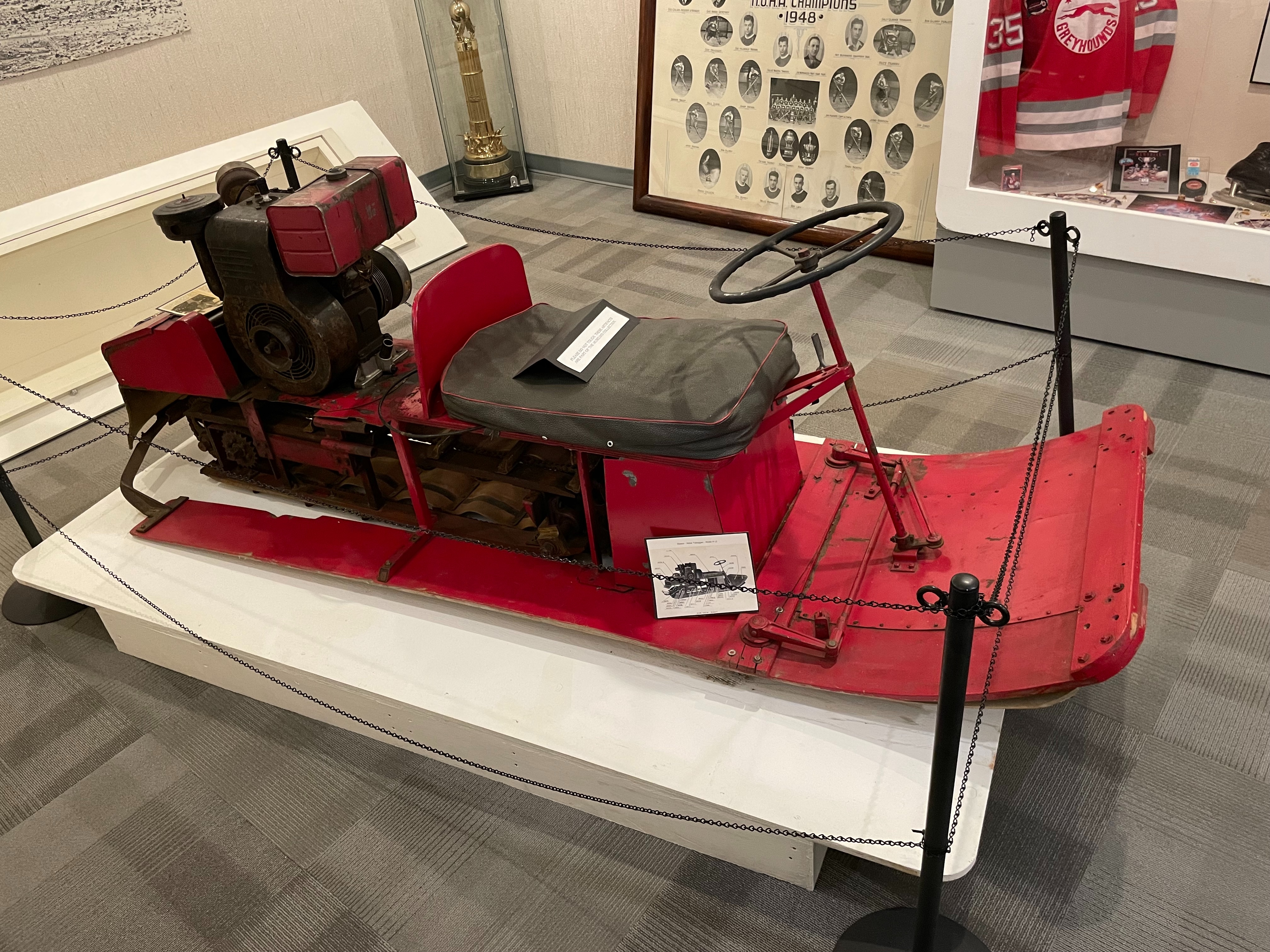
Eliason Motor Toboggan

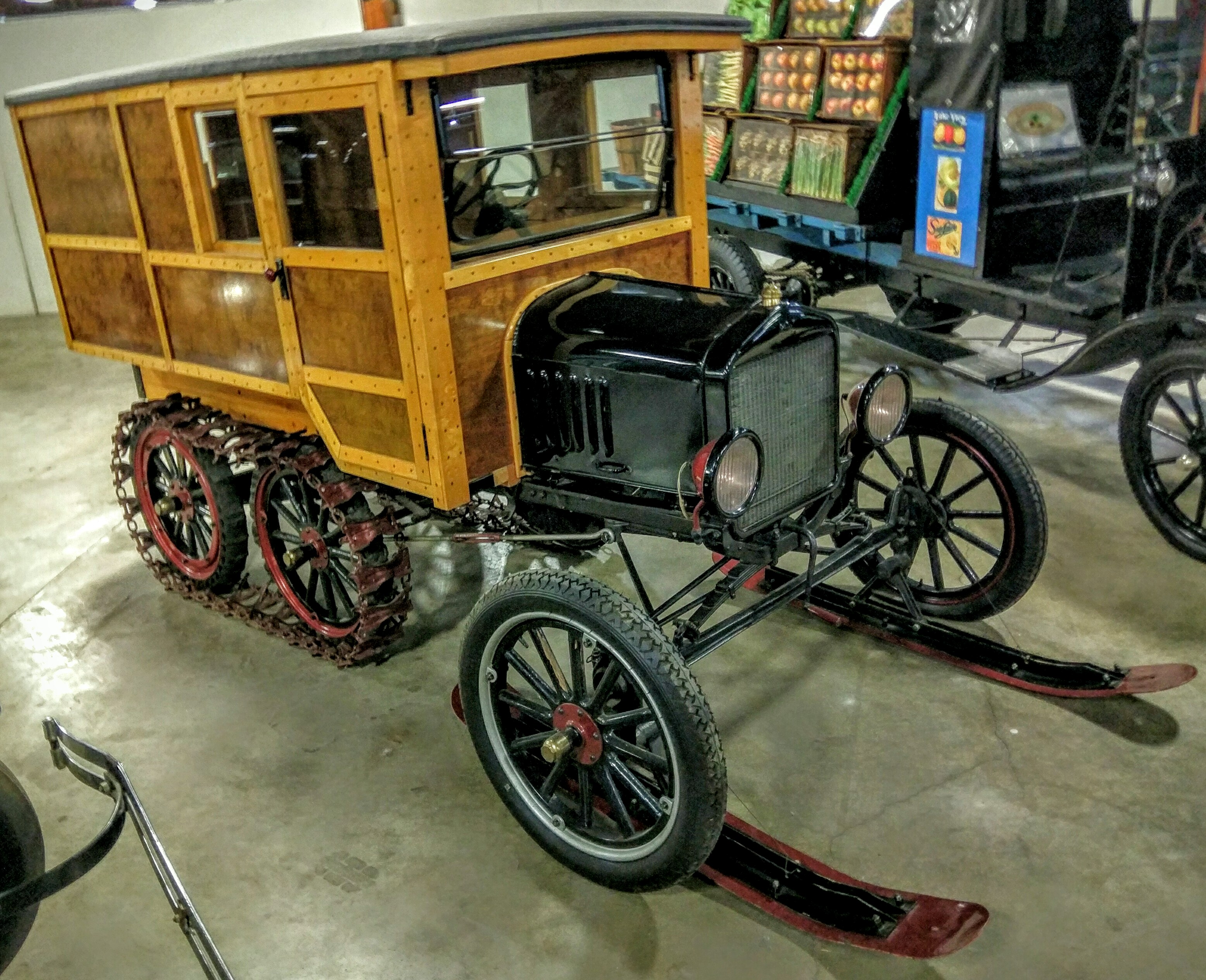
1921 Ford Model T snowmobile

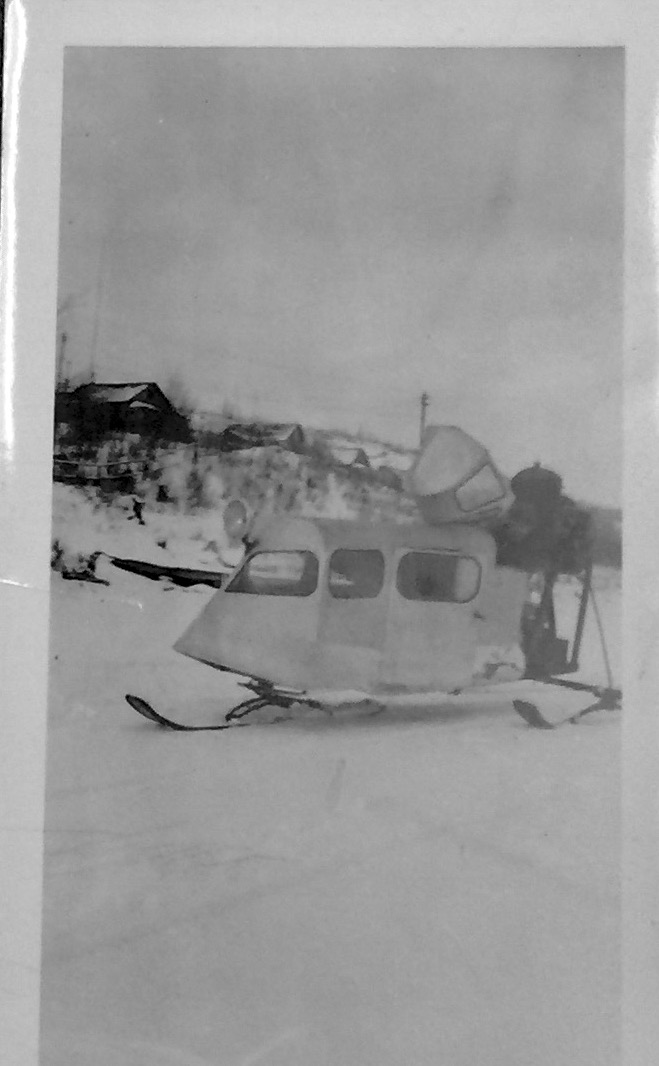
Airplane-engine-powered skimobile taxi in Red Lake, Canada, 1937

Carl Eliason of Sayner, Wisconsin developed the prototype of the modern snowmobile in 1924 when his Eliason Motor Toboggan mounted a two-cylinder motorcycle engine on a toboggan, steered it with skis under the front, and propelled it with single, endless track. Eliason made 40 snowmobiles, patented in 1927. Upon receiving an order for 200 from Finland, he sold his patent to the FWD Company of Clintonville. They made 300 for military use, then transferred the patent to a Canadian subsidiary which continued to produce models through 1963.

In 1917, Virgil D. White set up to create a patent for his conversion kit that changed the Ford Model T into a "snowmobile". He also trademarked the term "snowmobile". At the time, the conversion kit was expensive, costing about $395. Virgil White applied his patent in 1918 and created his own snowmobile. In 1922, his conversion kit was on the markets and available only through Ford dealerships.

The relatively dry snow conditions of the United States Midwest suited the converted Ford Model Ts and other like vehicles, but they were not suitable for humid snow areas such as southern Quebec and New England. This led Joseph-Armand Bombardier from the small town of Valcourt, Quebec, to invent a different caterpillar track system suitable for all kinds of snow conditions. Bombardier had already made some "metal" tracked vehicles since 1928, but his new revolutionary track traction system (a toothed wheel covered in rubber, and a rubber-and-cotton track that wraps around the back wheels) was his first major invention. He started production of the B-7, an enclosed, seven-passenger snowmobile, in 1937, and introduced the B-12, a twelve-passenger model, in 1942. The B-7 had a V-8 flathead engine from Ford Motor Company. The B-12 had a flathead in line six-cylinder engine from Chrysler industrial, and 2,817 units were produced until 1951. It was used in many applications, such as ambulances, Canada Post vehicles, winter "school buses", forestry machines, and even army vehicles in World War II. Bombardier had always dreamed of a smaller version, more like the size of a motor scooter.

=== Post-war developments ===
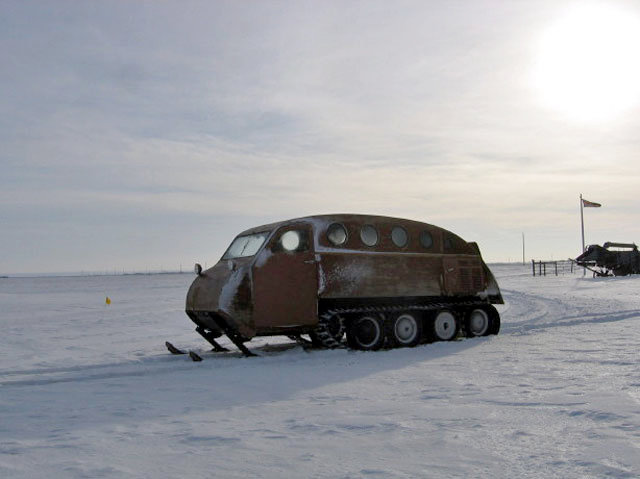
Early Bombardier snowmobile

Ingham Motor Toboggan company (1950–1970) of Allister and George Ingham produced the Ski-Bee Scout.

In 1951 Fritz Riemerschmid devised what he called a snow scooter. The machine had a track mounted beneath a snowboard-like base, on top of which were an enclosed engine with motorcycle like seat and fuel tank. the vehicle was steered via a steering wheel and cables linked to two small skis on outriggers either side of the vehicle.

In the mid-1950s, a United States firm built a "snowmobile the arctic area of Alaska that had the drive train reversed of today's snowmobiles with two front wheels—the larger one behind the smaller one—with tires driving an endless loop track". Little is known about this "snowmobile" meant to haul cargo and trade goods to isolated settlements.

Scorpion (1959–1981) of Crosby, Minnesota started as Trail-A-Sled.

An odd version of snowmobile is the Swedish Larven, made by the Lenko Company of Östersund, from the 1960s until the end of the 1980s. It was a very small and basic design, with just an engine in the rear and a track. The driver sat on it and steered using skis on his feet.

Moto-Ski (1963–1985), acquired by Bombardier Inc. in 1971.

Sweden produced the Ockelbo (1964–1989).

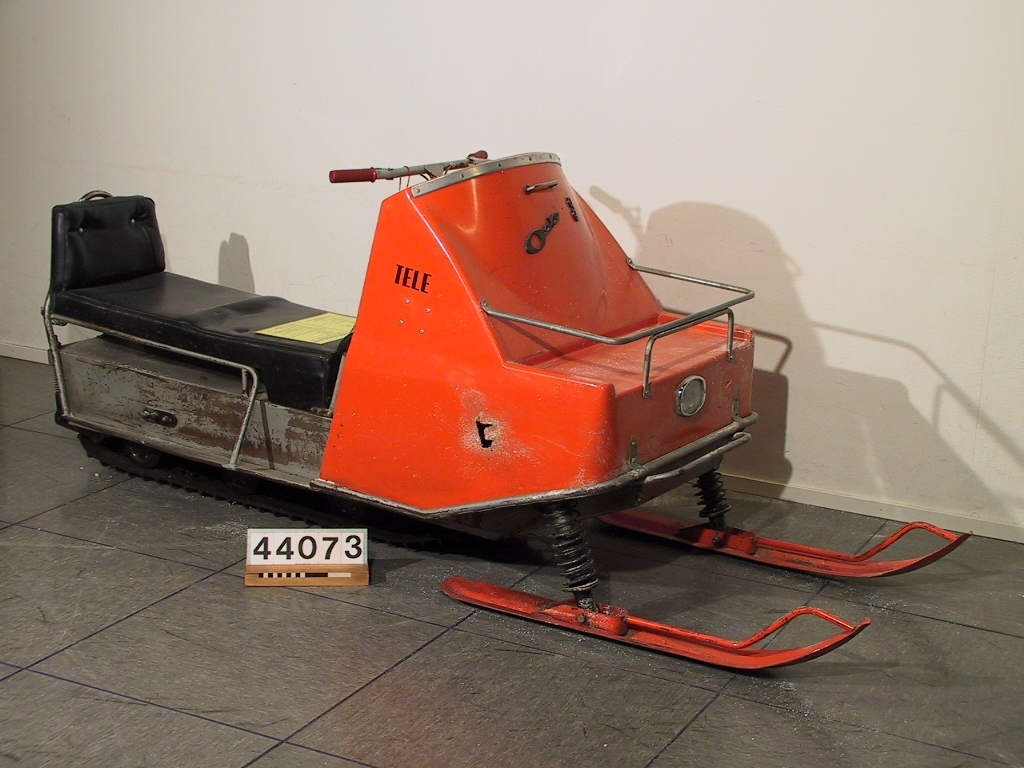
Ockelbo snowmobile

Yamaha (1968–2025)

Lynx (1968–1988) were produced by Finland's Velsa Oy then Nordtrac before being acquired by Bombardier Recreational Products in 1988.

John Deere snowmobiles (1972–1984)

Timbersled (2010–2025) made snow bikes and conversion kit systems. It was acquired by Polaris in 2015.

== Design ==
Most modern snowmobiles are powered by either a four- or two-stroke internal combustion engine, or are electric such as the Taiga TS2. Historically, snowmobiles used two-stroke engines because of their reduced complexity, weight and cost, compared to a similarly powered four-stroke. However, four-stroke powered snowmobiles have been gaining popularity. Yamaha only produced four-stroke snowmobiles. The Whistler Blackcomb ski resort is testing Taiga's electric snowmobiles with lower noise, and similar vehicles exist.

Early snowmobiles used simple rubber tracks, but modern snowmobiles' tracks are usually made of a Kevlar composite construction.

Older snowmobiles could generally accommodate two people; however, most snowmobiles manufactured since the 1990s have been designed to only accommodate one person. Snowmobiles built with the ability to accommodate two people are referred to as "2-up" snowmobiles or "touring" models and make up an extremely small share of the market.

Most snowmobiles do not have any enclosures, except for a windshield.

== Performance ==
The first snowmobiles made do with as little as 5 horsepower (3.7 kW) engines, but engine sizes and efficiency have improved drastically. In the early 1990s, the biggest engines available (typically 600 cc–800 cc displacement range) produced around 115 hp (86 kW). As of 2022, several snowmobiles are available with engines sizes up to 1,200 cc, producing over 150 hp, as well as several models with up to 1,000 cc engines producing closer to 210 hp (160 kW). Recently, some models are turbo-charged, resulting in dramatic increase of engine horsepower.

Snowmobiles are capable of moving across steep hillsides without sliding down-slope if the rider transfers their weight towards the uphill side, a process called side-hilling.

Higher-powered modern snowmobiles can achieve speeds over 150 mph (240 km/h). Drag racing snowmobiles can reach speeds over 200 mph (320 km/h).

Mountain sleds are made for deep snow. Their main differences compared to trail sleds are weight, weight distribution, track length, paddle depth, and power. Technology and design advances in mountain snowmobiles have improved since 2003 with Ski-Doo's introduction of the "REV" framework platform. Most two-stroke mountain snowmobiles have a top engine size of 800 cc, producing around 150 hp (110 kW), although some 1,000 cc factory machines have been produced.

Cornices and other kinds of jumps are sought after for aerial maneuvers. Riders often search for non-tracked, virgin terrain and are known to "trailblaze" or "boondock" deep into remote territory where there is absolutely no visible path to follow. However, this type of trailblazing is dangerous as contact with buried rocks, logs, and frozen ground can cause extensive damage and injuries. Riders look for large open fields of fresh snow where they can carve. Some riders use extensively modified snowmobiles, customized with aftermarket accessories like handle-bar risers, handguards, custom/lightweight hoods, windshields, and seats, running board supports, studs, and numerous other modifications that increase power and maneuverability.

Trail snowmobiles: heavy "muscle sleds" can produce speeds in excess of 100 mph (160 km/h) due to powerful engines (up to 1,200 cc stock, and custom engines exceeding 1,200 cc), short tracks, and good traction on groomed trails. Sno-cross oriented snowmobiles often have an engine size cap of 440 or 600 cc.

== Brands ==
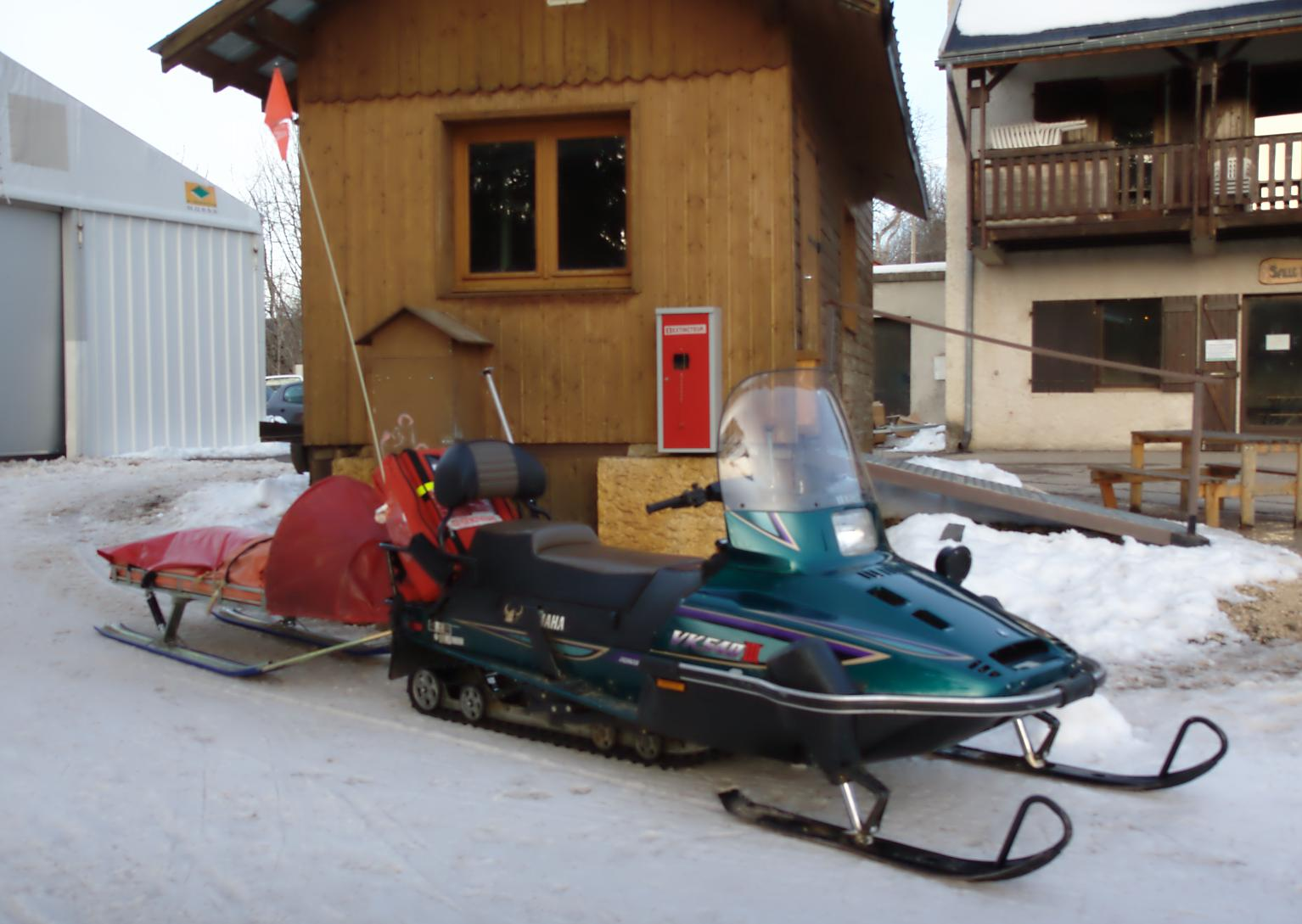
A snowmobile used by emergency services in ski areas in Vercors, French Alps. It carries emergency equipment and tows a stretcher.

Snow mobile race in 1979, Dutch newsreel

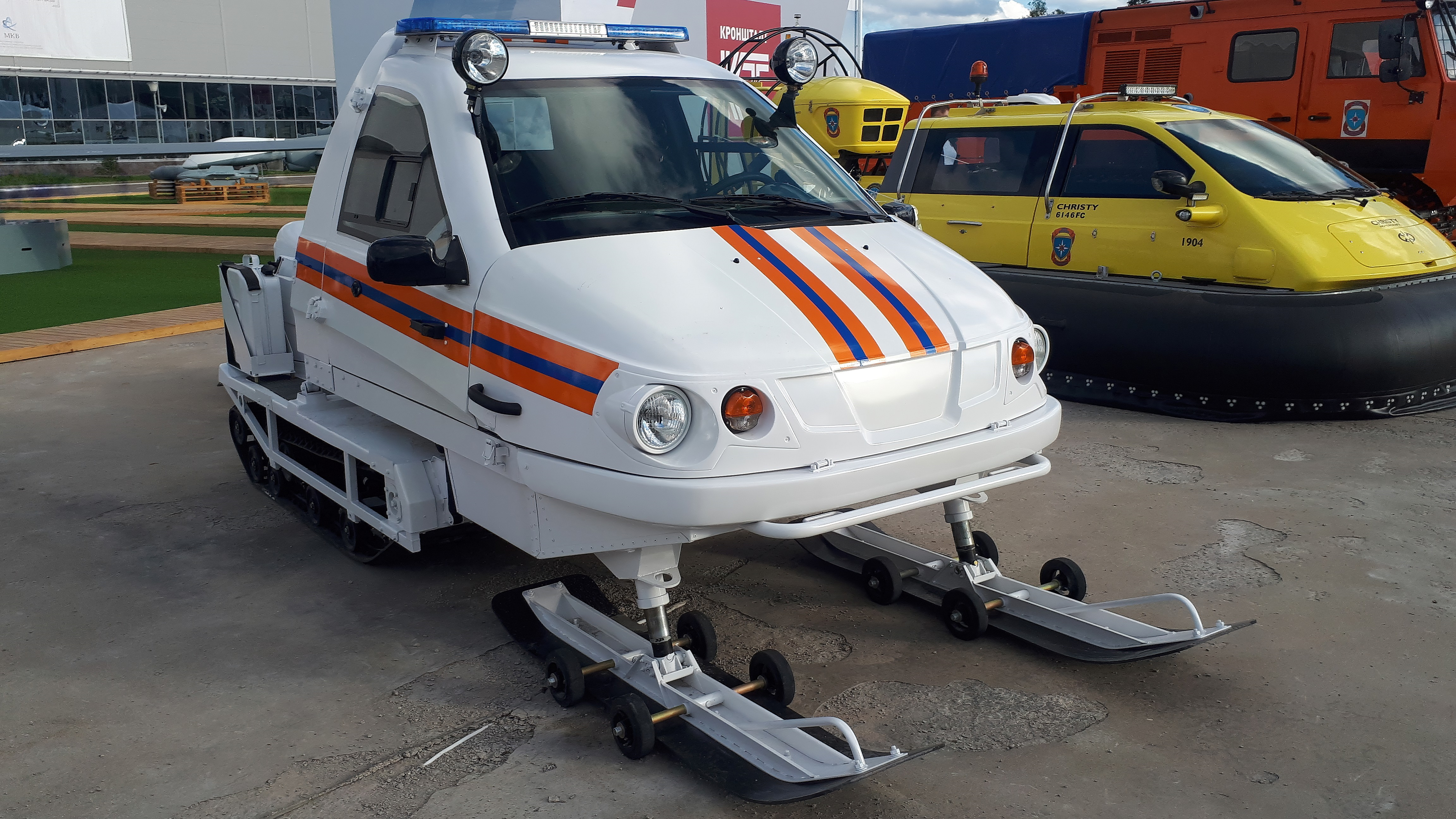
Arctic snowmobile with heated cabin

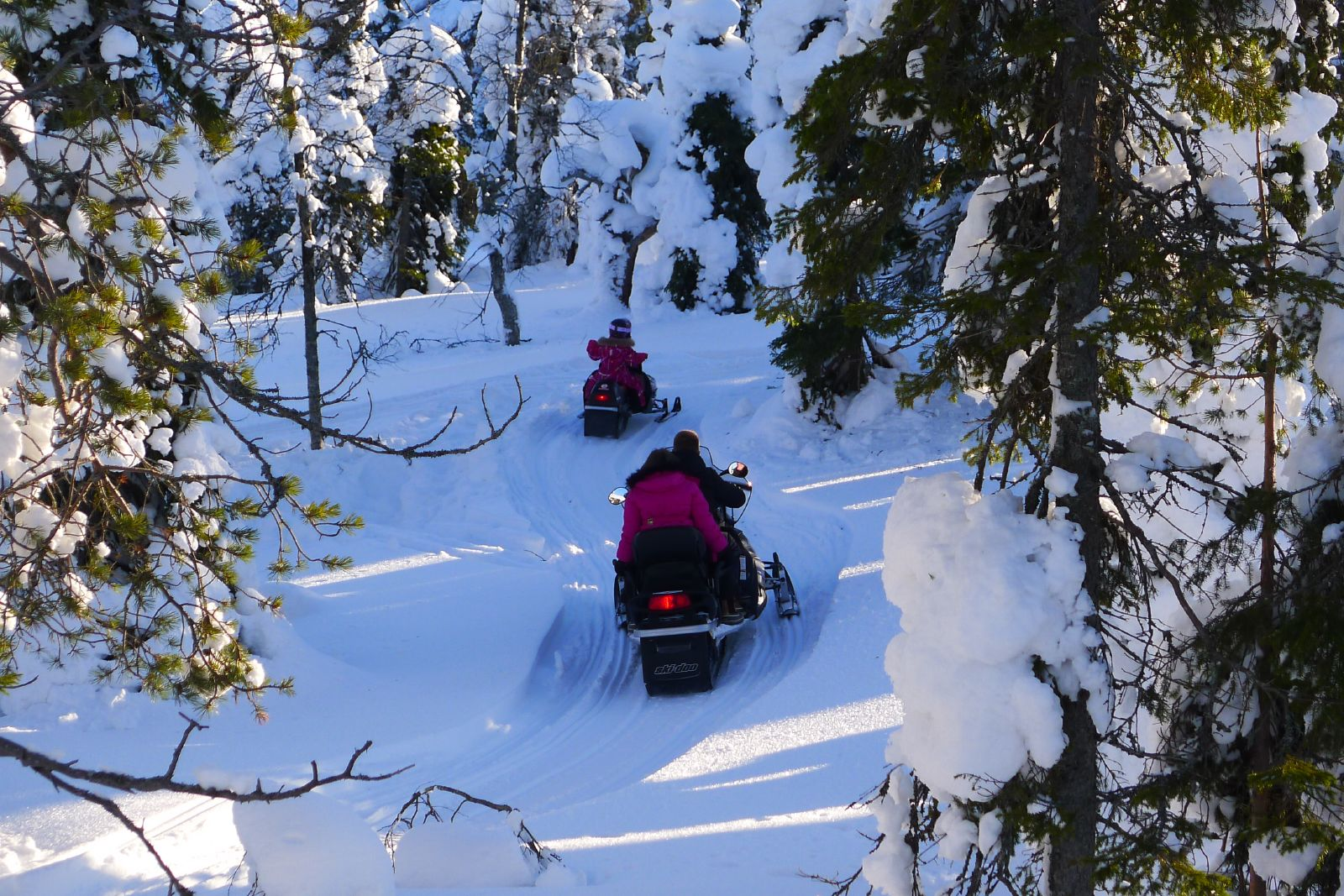
A family with snowmobiles at the forest of Ruka in Kuusamo, Finland

More than 90,000 snowmobiles are sold annually.

Snowmobiles are widely used in arctic territories for travel. However, the tiny Arctic population means a correspondingly small market. Most snowmobiles are sold for recreational purposes in places where snow cover is stable during winter. The number of snowmobiles in Europe and other parts of the world is low.

Snowmobiles designed to perform various work tasks have been available for many years with dual tracks from such manufacturers as Aktiv (Sweden), who made the Grizzly, Ockelbo (Sweden), who made the 8000, and Bombardier who made the Alpine and later the Alpine II. Currently, there are two manufacturers of dual-track snowmobiles; Russia's Buran and the Italian Alpina snowmobiles (under the name Sherpa and Superclass).

=== Polaris ===
Edgar and Allen Hetteen and David Johnson of Roseau, Minnesota, invented what we now know as the modern snowmobile in 1955–1956, but the early machines were heavy (1,000 lb or 450 kg) and slow (20 mph or 32 km/h). Their company, Hetteen Hoist & Derrick Co., became Polaris Industries which introduced their first commercial model, the Polaris Sno Traveler in 1957.

=== Ski-Doo ===
In 1960, Joseph-Armand Bombardier introduced his own snowmobile using an open-cockpit one- or two-person form, similar to the 1957 Polaris Sno Traveler, and started selling it under the brand name Ski-Doo through his company Bombardier Inc. (now manufactured by Bombardier Recreational Products). Competitors copied and improved his design; in the 1970s there were over a hundred snowmobile manufacturers. From 1970 to 1973, two million machines were sold, peaking at 500,000 sold in 1971. Many of the snowmobile companies were small and the biggest manufacturers were often attempts by motorcycle makers and outboard motor makers to branch off in a new market. Most of these companies went bankrupt or were acquired by larger companies during the 1973 oil crisis and succeeding recessions. Sales rebounded to 260,000 in 1997 but gradually decreased afterward, influenced by warmer winters and the use during all four seasons of small one- or two-person ATVs.

=== Arctic Cat ===
Arctic Cat was formed by snowmobile pioneer Edgar Hetteen in 1960.

=== Alpina ===
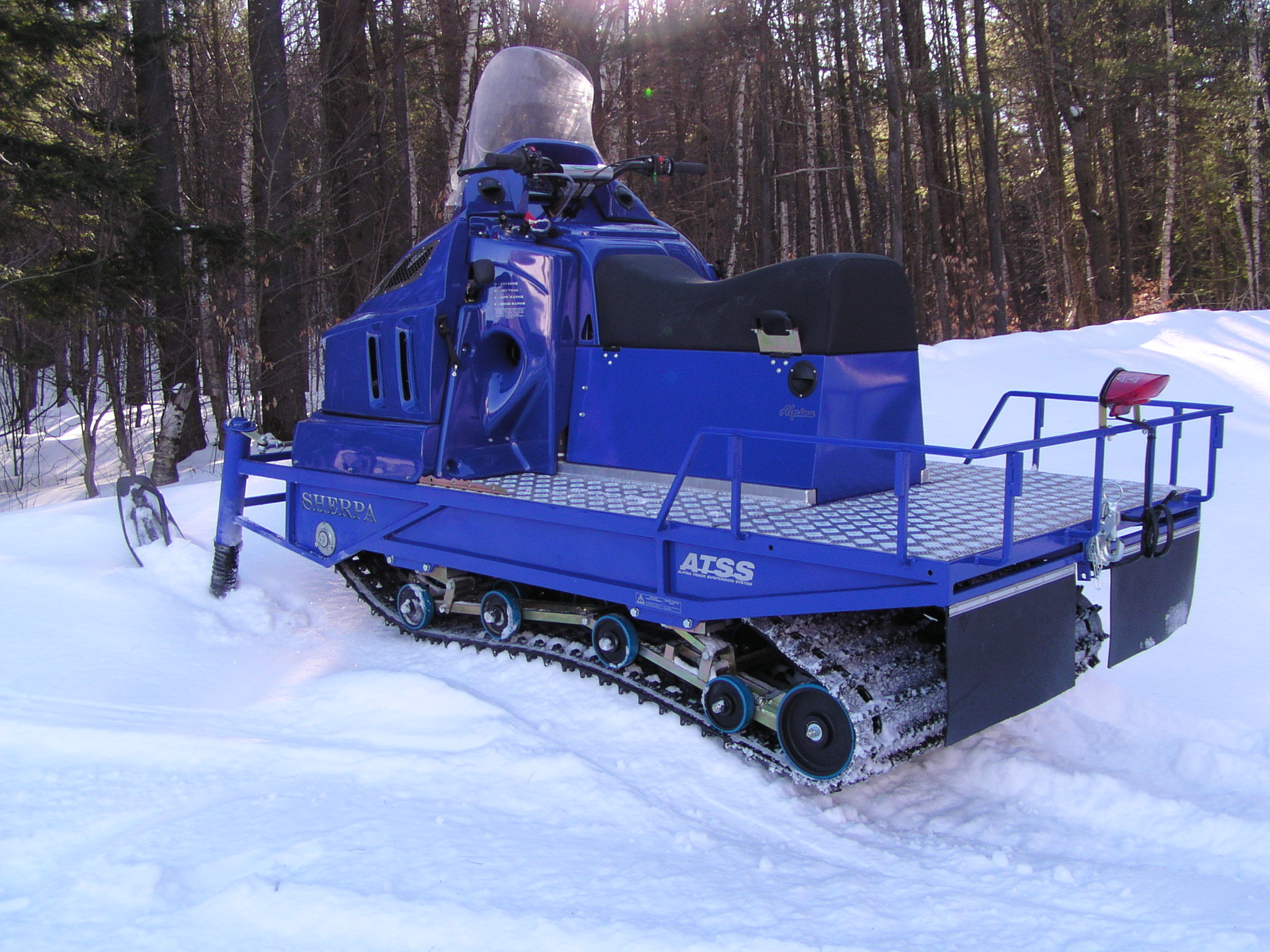
Alpina Sherpa, a dual track snowmobile

Alpina Snowmobiles are manufactured in Vicenza, Italy, by Alpina s.r.l., a manufacturer of various on-snow implements that had been building dual-track snowmobiles since 1995.

Alpina manufactures one basic dual-track snowmobile design. In 2002 the Sherpa was introduced and is the model name for the four-stroke machine. Prior to introducing the Sherpa, Alpina offered a two-stroke series designated the Superclass. The four-stroke Sherpa is currently the top machine in production. A new version of the Superclass has been released in 2017, with a lot of innovations and a new four-stroke engine. The Sherpa and Superclass series shared the same basic dual-track platform, twin 20 in × 156 in (510 mm × 3,960 mm) tracks with dual skis up front. Power for the Sherpa is supplied by a 1.6L in-line four-cylinder gasoline automotive engine. The new Superclass power is provided by a 1.2L 3-cylinder four-stroke gasoline engine. The Sherpa and Superclass are designed as working snowmobiles for carrying supplies, pulling cargo sleds, pulling trail grooming implements, carrying several passengers, and negotiating deep snow. Engine and transmission combination are designed to deliver optimum power to pull or carry large loads while top-end speeds are kept below 52 mph (84 km/h), depending on the model. The large footprint of the dual tracks and dual skis allows the Sherpa and Superclass to "float" on top of deep snow and not sink in and get stuck.

=== Taiga Electric ===
Taiga Motors in Montreal created the first commercially produced electric snowmobile. The Taiga TS2 can go from zero to 100 km/h (62 mph) in 3 seconds, with 250 N⋅m (180 lb⋅ft) of instant torque. The Taiga TS2 weighs 470 lb (210 kg).

== Sport ==
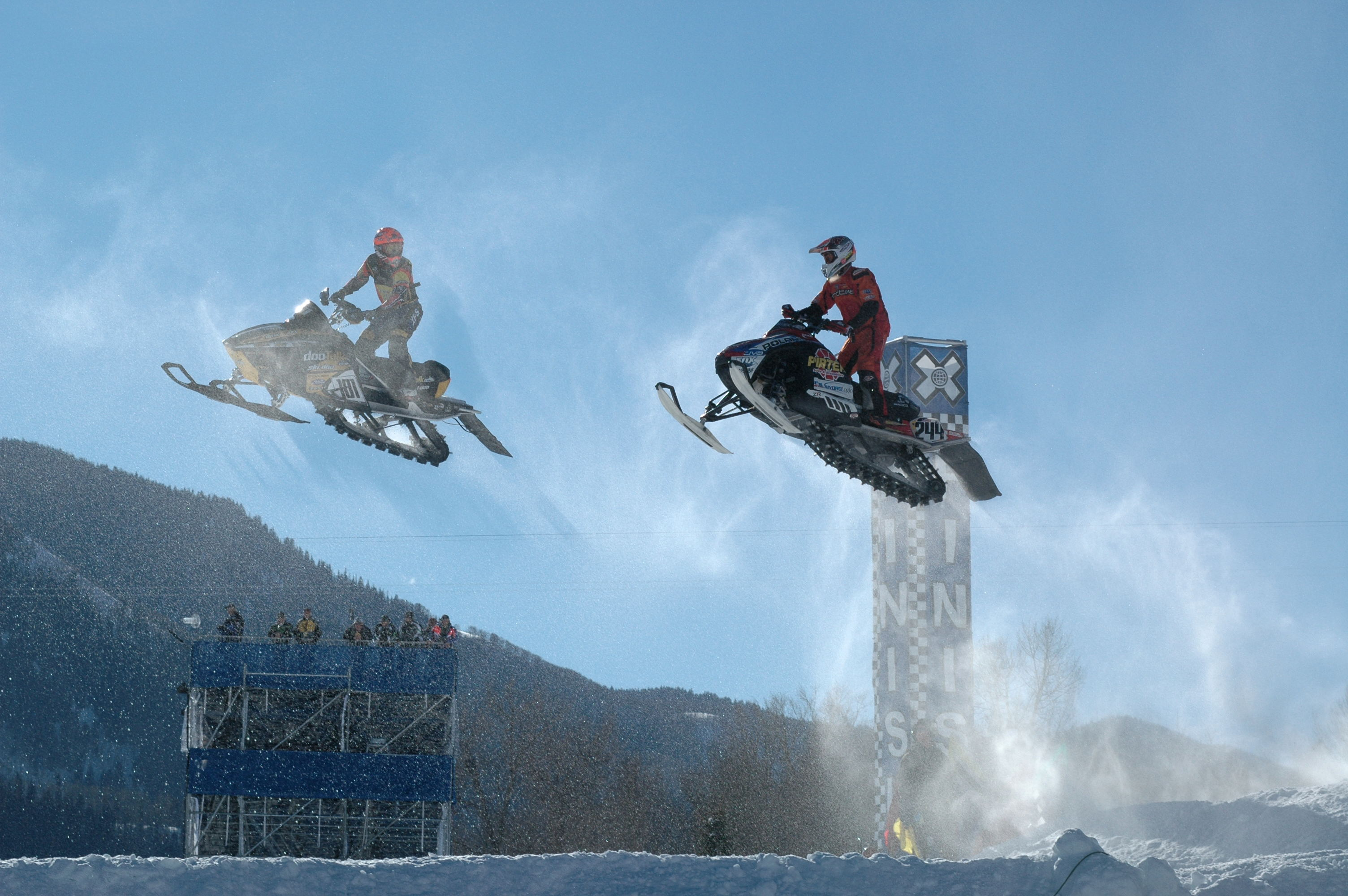
Snowmobile race

- The International 500 is a large racing event held annually in Sault Sainte Marie, Michigan. It is a 500-mile (800 km) race on a track, with the current purse being in excess of $40,000. It has been running since February 1969.
- Drag racing is common with snowmobiles year-round, with summer and fall often with grass or closed-course (asphalt or concrete) drag strips. The largest event is Hay Days in North Branch, Minnesota, on the first weekend following Labor Day.
- The World Championship Watercross or snowmobile skipping races are held in Grantsburg, Wisconsin, in July. The snowmobiles are raced on a marked course, similar to motocross courses, without the ramps and on water.
- The Snocross racing series are snowmobile races on a motocross-like course. The races are held during the winter season in Northern United States and Canada. One of the largest in New York is the Northeast SnoX Challenge in early January in Malone, New York, and run by Rock Maple Racing and sponsored by the Malone Chamber of Commerce.
- Snowmobiles are used for ice racing. The racing is held on an "Ice Oval" track. The World Championship Snowmobile Derby is held each winter in Eagle River, Wisconsin.
- Alaska's "Iron Dog" is the longest snowmachine race in the world. It is 2,031 miles (3,269 km) long and runs from Big Lake to Nome to Fairbanks. The name refers to dog mushing, long popular in Alaska.
- Vintage Snowmobile Racing is the racing of vintage snowmobiles and has grown in popularity as a sporting event on the Canadian prairie and in America.
- The World Championship Hill Climb competition is held in Jackson, Wyoming, at the Snow King Mountain resort each year in March. 2019 was the 43rd year of the four-day event and drew around 10,000 in attendance.

== Variants ==
A snow bike takes a typical dirt bike and replaces the rear wheel with a single tread system similar to a snowmobile and the front wheel with a large ski. It is much smaller and nimbler than a snowmobile, and it has a tighter turning radius, which lets the rider go where many snowmobiles cannot. The first prototype of motorcycles with a rear tread date to the 1920s, with subsequent failed attempts to bring them to market. Many motorcycles made after the 1990s can be fitted with kits that transform them into snow bikes. Timbersled (2010–2025) made snow bike systems.

In 2017, Winter X Games XXI introduced the first snow bike event in the form of a SnowBikeCross race. The following year they introduced a Best Trick event.

== Accidents and safety ==
As a result of their inherent maneuverability, acceleration, and high-speed abilities, skill and physical strength are both required to operate a snowmobile.

Snowmobile injuries and fatalities are high compared to those caused by on road motor vehicle traffic. Losing control of a snowmobile can easily cause extensive damage, injury, or death. One such cause of snowmobile accidents is loss of control from a loose grip. If the rider falls off, the loss of control can easily result in the snowmobile colliding with a nearby object, such as a rock or tree. Most snowmobiles are fitted with a cord connected to a kill switch, which would stop the snowmobile if the rider falls off; however, not all riders use this device every time they operate a snowmobile.

Swerving off of the path may result in rolling the snowmobile or crashing into an obstacle. In unfamiliar areas, riders may crash into suspended barbed wire or haywire fences at high speeds. Each year a number of serious or fatal accidents are caused by these factors.

Each year, riders are killed by hitting other snowmobiles, automobiles, pedestrians, rocks, trees, or fences, or falling through thin ice. On average, 10 people a year have died in such crashes in Minnesota alone, with alcohol a contributing factor in many cases. In Saskatchewan, 16 out of 21 deaths in snowmobile collisions between 1996 and 2000 were caused by the effects of alcohol. Wrestler Lindsey Durlacher died in 2011 following surgery for a broken sternum he sustained in a snowmobile accident.

Fatal collisions with trains can also occur when a snowmobile operator engages in the illegal practice of "rail riding", riding between railroad track rails over snow-covered sleepers. Inability to hear the sound of an oncoming train over the engine noise of a snowmobile makes this activity extremely dangerous. Collision with large animals such as moose and deer, which may venture onto a snowmobile trail, is another major cause of snowmobile accidents. Most often such encounters occur at night or in low-visibility conditions when the animal could not be seen in time to prevent a collision. Also even when successful, a sudden maneuver to miss hitting the animal could still result in the operator losing control of the snowmobile.

The next leading cause of injury and death is avalanches, which can result from the practice of highmarking, or driving a snowmobile as far up a hill as it can go. During the 2018–2019 season, 7 snowmobilers in the United States were killed. Avalanche safety education is critical for those accessing the backcountry.

Risks can be reduced through education, proper training, appropriate gear, attention to published avalanche warnings and avoiding drinking alcohol. In some areas of Western U.S., organizations provide avalanche training, some of which is free. It is recommended that snowmobile riders wear a helmet and a snowmobile suit.

== Legislation ==
Depending on jurisdiction, there may be penalties for driving outside permitted areas, without an approved helmet, without a driver's license, with an unregistered snowmobile, or while under the influence of alcohol or other substances. There may also be regulations regarding noise and wildlife.

In some jurisdictions, a driver's license is required to operate a snowmobile. A specific snowmobile driver's license is required in, for example, Norway and Sweden. In Finland, a snowmobile driver's license is not required if the driver already has another type of appropriate driver's license (for example car or tractor).

== Environmental impact ==
The environmental impact of snowmobiles has been the subject of much debate. Governments have reacted to noise and air pollution with the U.S. Noise Control Act of 1972 and the Canadian Environmental Protection Act, 1999, but the set of rules governing pollution emissions for off-road vehicles was only released in January 2005. In another example of regulation, only four-stroke snowmobiles are allowed in Yellowstone National Park since a bylaw was recently passed to minimize CO_{2} emissions and noise. In Yellowstone, snowmobiles account for 80% of total hydrocarbon emissions and 50% of carbon monoxide emissions in the winter. This is just less than 2% and 1% respectively of the overall annual pollution within the park. Snowmobiles are only allowed to be ridden on the unplowed roads used in the summer, and riding off the roads is prohibited. This accounts for less than 1% (0.002%) of the park area.

In 2005 the US Forest Service published a Travel Management Rule for off-highway vehicles, strengthening the implementation of Executive Orders issued in the 1970s. However, these rules were not applied to snowmobiles. In 2015, following a decision in a lawsuit brought by Winter Wildlands Alliance against the Forest Service, the rules were extended to snowmobiles, referred to as an over-snow vehicle (OSV). National Forests with sufficient snow for winter recreation are now required to designate where OSVs are allowed to travel and where they are prohibited. In doing so, the Forest Service must minimize 1) damage to soil, watershed, vegetation, and other forest resources; 2) harassment of wildlife and significant disruption of wildlife habitats; and 3) conflicts between motor vehicle use and existing or proposed recreational uses of National Forest System lands or neighboring Federal lands.

=== Air ===
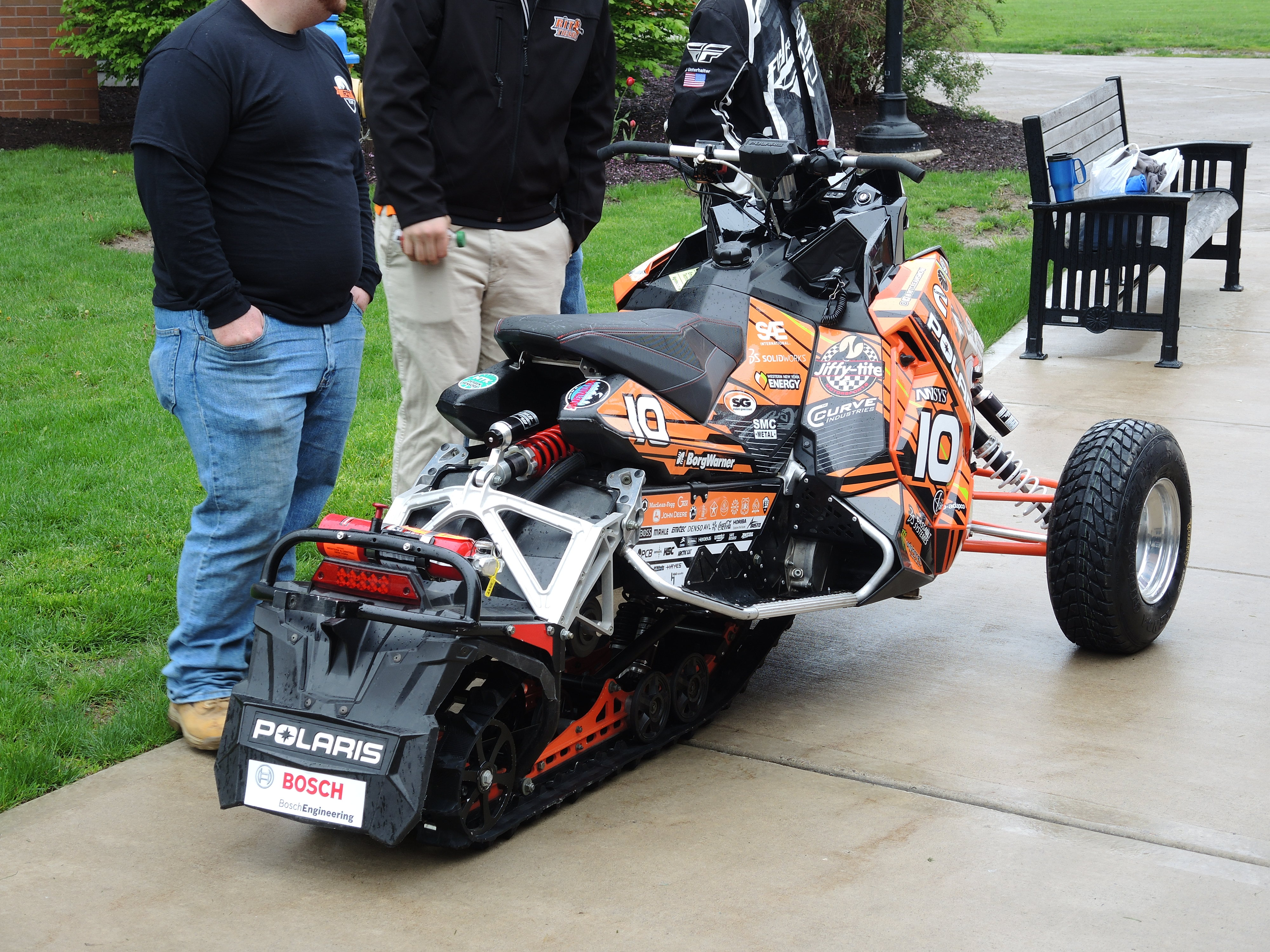
Student-constructed SAE clean snowmobile at Imagine RIT 2017

Most snowmobiles are still powered by two-stroke engines, although Alpina and Yamaha have been using four-strokes since 2002 and 2003, respectively. However, in the last decade several manufacturers have been successful in designing less polluting motors, and putting most of them in production. Yamaha and Arctic-Cat were the first to mass-produce four-stroke models, which are significantly less polluting than the early two-stroke machines. Alpina offers only four-stroke EFI engines equipped with a catalytic converter and dual oxygen-probe. Bombardier's E-Tec two-stroke motors emit 85% less pollutants than previous carbureted two-strokes. Polaris has developed a fuel-injection technology called "Cleanfire Injection" on their two-strokes. The industry is also working on a direct-injected "clean two strokes" that is better in terms of NO_{X} emissions.

Independent researchers, undergraduates and graduate students participate in contests to lessen the impact of emissions from snowmobiles. The Clean Snow Mobile Challenge is held yearly at Michigan Technological University regrouping the entries from universities from across United States and Canada. Some of the participants in recent years have been the École polytechnique de Montréal with a Quasiturbine engine and students from École de technologie supérieure of the UQAM with a less polluting two-stroke engine using E85 and direct injection.

=== Noise ===
Maximum noise restrictions have been enacted by law for both production of snowmobiles and aftermarket components. For instance, in Quebec (Canada) noise levels must be 78 decibels or less at 20 meters from a snowmobile path. As of 2009, snowmobiles produce 90% less noise than in the 1960s but there are still numerous complaints. Efforts to reduce noise focus on suppressing mechanical noise of the suspension components and tracks. Arctic Cat in 2005 introduced "Silent Track technology" on touring models such as the T660 Turbo, Bearcat, and some M-Series sleds. Ski-Doo has since then also used comparative "silent track technology" on some models.

The use of aftermarket exhaust systems ("cans" or "silencers") is controversial. These replace the stock muffler with a less restrictive system that is usually claimed to increase power output of the engine. However, these aftermarket exhausts are often much louder than those from the factory, with only some being slightly quieter than a completely open, unbaffled system. Most, if not all, local snowmobile clubs (that maintain and groom trail systems) do not recommend them because of noise. Local and state authorities have set up checkpoints on high-traffic trails, checking for excessively loud systems and issuing citations. Typically these systems are installed on two-stroke powered machines (giving the distinctive "braap" sound); however, in recent years aftermarket companies have released silencers for four-stroke models as well.

== Economic impact ==
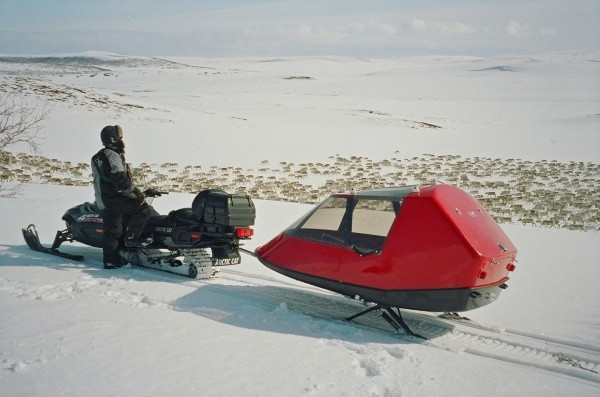
Snowmobiles are used by reindeer herders

According to the International Snowmobile Manufacturers Association, snowmobilers in Canada and the United States spend over $28 billion on snowmobiling each year. This includes expenditures on equipment, clothing, accessories, snowmobiling vacations (lodging, fuel, and food), maintenance and others. Often this is the only source of income for some smaller towns, such as Bralorne, British Columbia, that rely solely on tourism during the summer and winter months. Once a booming gold mining town, Bralorne is now a very small town with a population of 60, and it is relatively inaccessible by car in the winter. The economy relies on visits from snowmobilers, who contribute to the economy by spending money on gas, food, and hotels.

== Social impact ==
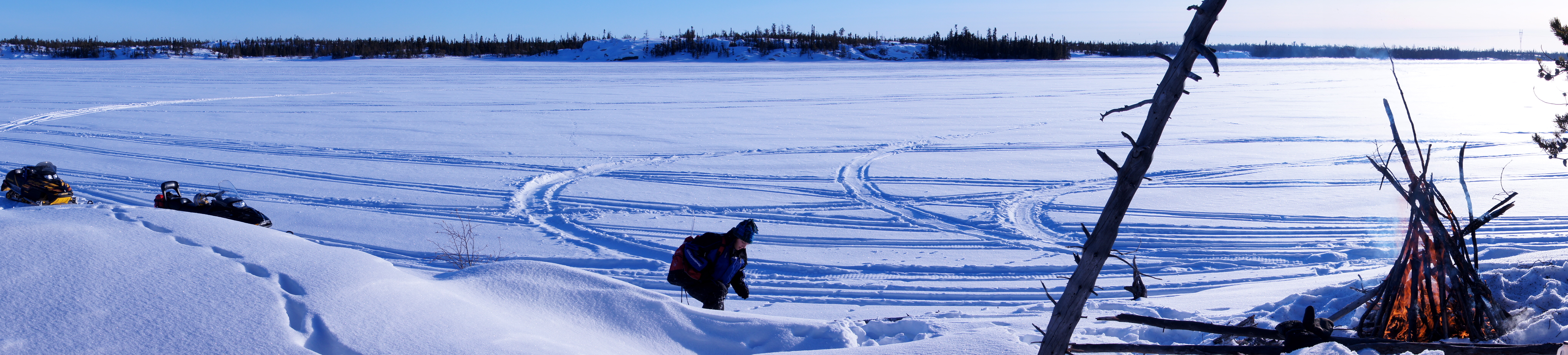
Snowmobiling near Martin Lake, Northwest Territories, Canada for a winter picnic in February

Since the invention of snowmobiles, isolated communities of northern North America have always had a demand for them. However, the early snowmobiles designs were not economical or functional enough for the harsh environment of northern North America. Joseph-Armand Bombardier started producing the Ski-Doo in 1959 at the request of a priest. The priest had asked Bombardier to make an economical and reliable means of winter travel. The Ski-Doo greatly changed life in northern North America's isolated communities, where Ski-Doo replaced sled dogs by the end of the 1960s. The Ski-Doo also greatly improved communication between isolated communities.

In northern North America, historically, isolated communities depended on dog sledding and snowshoeing as their primary method of transportation for hunting during the winter months. The Ski-Doo allowed trappers to travel greater distances faster, allowing them to expand their hunting grounds. Prospectors, mining companies, foresters, backcountry cabin owners, the Royal Canadian Mounted Police and Canadian Army also found snowmobiles very effective because they were the most economical method of transportation of small loads.

Joseph-Armand Bombardier's trials proved that snowmobiling was fun, and snowmobiling became a new form of outdoor recreation.

== See also ==
- Hyanide – Combination of a dirt bike and a snowmobile with four-wheel drive
- Hydrocopter – Amphibious propeller-driven catamaran
- Snowcat
- List of Canadian inventions and discoveries
- Non-road engine – Internal combustion engine classification
- Snow coach – Vehicle specialized for snowy or icy conditions
- ZIL-2906
