= Hell and High Water =

Hell and High Water may refer to:

== Film and television ==
- Hell and High Water (1933 film), an American Pre-Code drama film
- Hell and High Water (1954 film), a Cold War drama film
- "Hell and High Water", an episode of ER (season 2)
- "Hell and High Water", an episode of Bugs

== Literature ==
- Hell and High Water (book), by Joseph J. Romm, 2006
- Hell and High Water: Climate Change, Hope and the Human Condition, by Alastair McIntosh, 2008

== Music ==
- "Hell and High Water" (T. Graham Brown song), 1986
- "Hell and High Water" (Black Stone Cherry song), 2006
- "Hell and High Water", a song by The Allman Brothers Band from the 1980 album Reach for the Sky

== See also ==
- Hell or High Water (disambiguation)
