= Hyanide =

Combination of a dirt bike and a snowmobile with four-wheel drive

The Hyanide is a hybrid motorbike vehicle designed and created by German designers Tilmann Schlootz and Oliver Keller. The motorbike is a combination of dirt bike-snowmobile-four-wheel vehicle concepts which was first showcased at the 2006 Michelin Challenge Design competition. It can move through deep mud, sand and snow terrains via a continuous track. Currently, only a prototype exists as a one-fifth scale model.

== Specifications ==
The Hyanide has a capacity of about two persons. Its engine is composed of a 60hp 500cc liquid-cooled single-cylinder. The dimensions for the motorbike vehicle is according: 40 (h) x 36 (w) x 90 (l) in. Its weight is estimated to be about 450 to 650 lbs. Also, its top speed is as well estimated to be 75 to 85 mph.

== Production ==
According to the Hyanide's designers, Tilmann Schlootz and Oliver Keller, there are no current plans to develop and manufacture a production version for the market.

== See also ==
- Continuous track
- Kégresse track
