= American Motor Sleigh =

The American Motor Sleigh was a snowmobile made by the American Motor Sleigh Co. in 1905. It was designed for travel on snow, with a single-cylinder engine which drove a pronged wheel, with runners in place of conventional wheels.
