= Ski suit =

Clothing for skiing

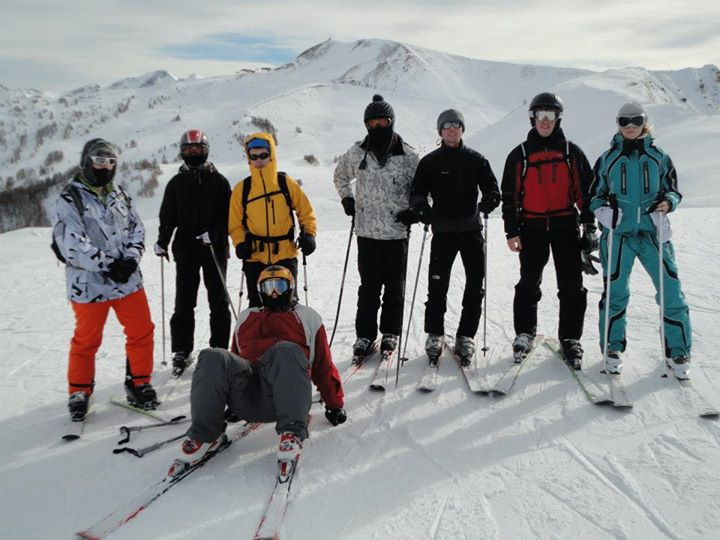
A group of skiers with one- and two-piece ski suits.

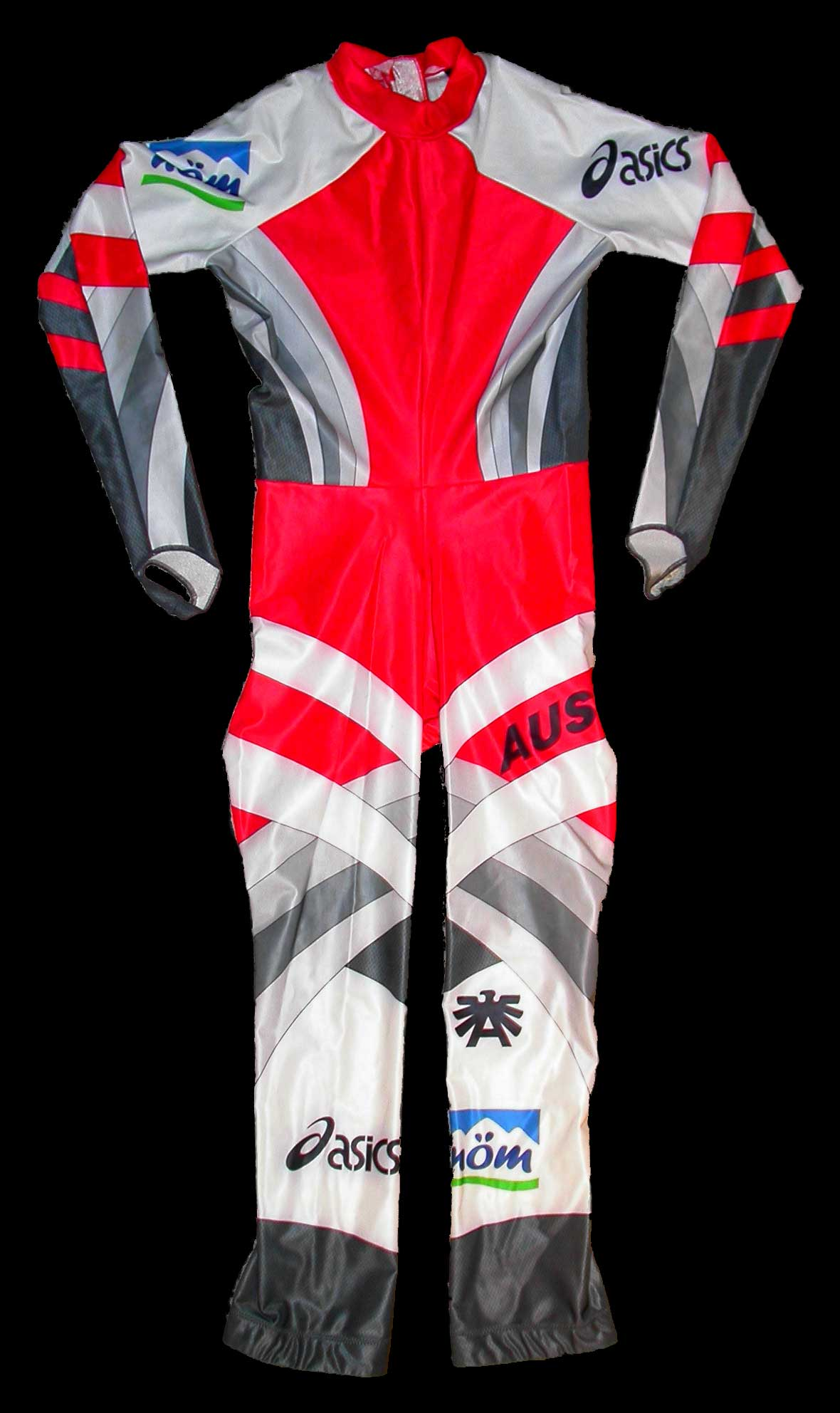
An Austrian professional ski suit.

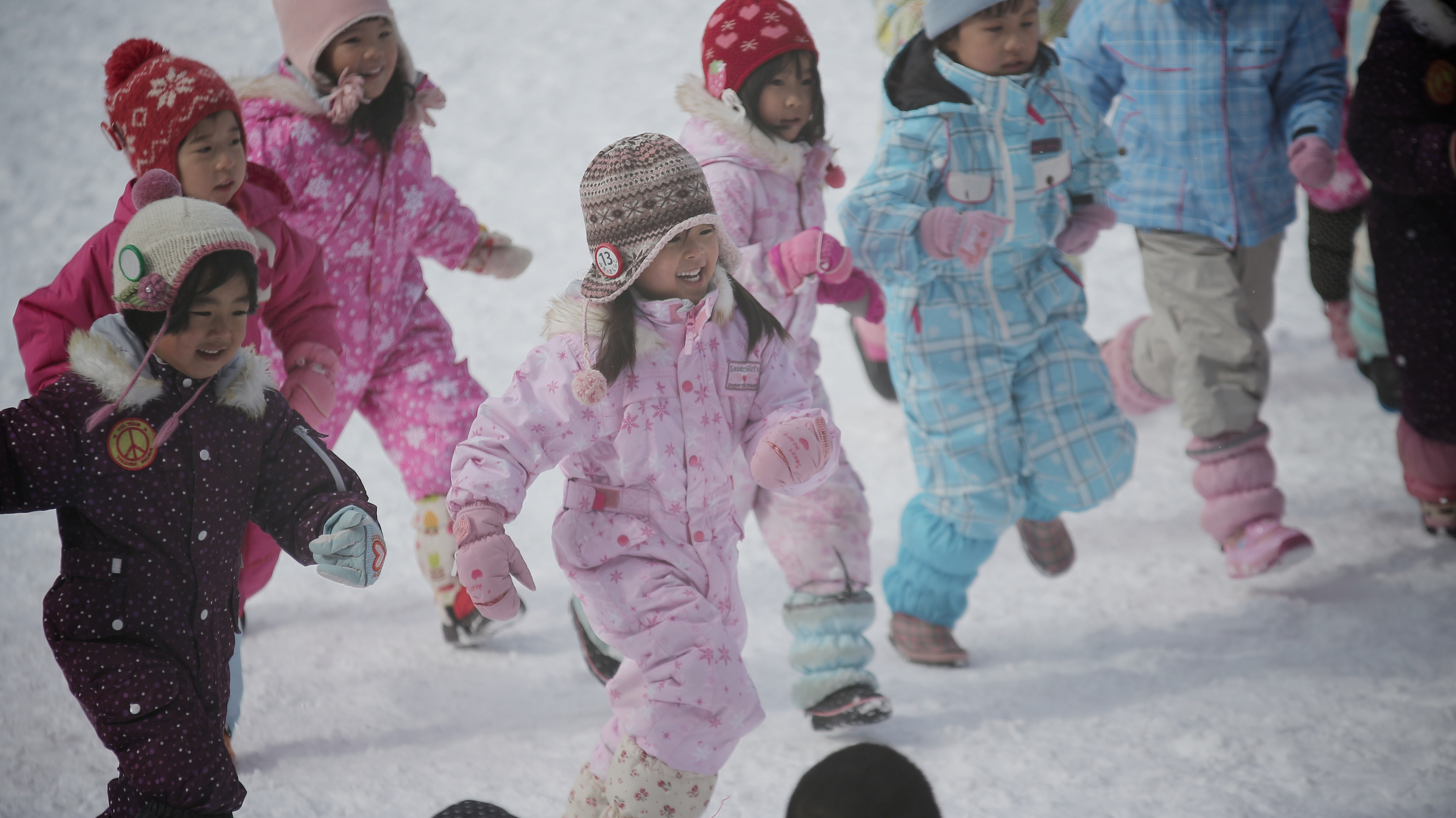
Children wearing snowsuits.

A ski suit is a suit made to be worn over the rest of the clothes when skiing or snowboarding. Ski suits made for more casual winter wear outdoors may also be called snowsuits and are often used by children as everyday outerwear in the winter season. Some suits are specifically made for snowboarders but most are used by either skiers or snowboarders regardless of the style.

== Design ==
A ski suit can either be one-piece, in the form of a jumpsuit, or two-piece, in the form of a ski jacket and matching trousers, called salopettes or ski pants. A ski suit is made from wind- and water-resistant or waterproof fabric, and has a non-removable liner made of nylon, silk, cotton or taffeta. Its main function is to keep a person warm while participating in winter sports, especially Nordic (cross-country) or alpine (down-hill) skiing. It is generally a unisex garment. A ski suit is meant to be worn with a base layer, which consists of long johns and a warm shirt, usually designed for skiing. Ski suits are often made of Gore-Tex or similar materials. They are often in the form of a shell suit, to which the skier adds more or less warm underwear depending on the weather. Pockets are usually made to be waterproof, so items put in them can stay dry.

=== One-piece ski suits ===
A one-piece ski suit is sometimes called a "freedom suit". It covers the whole torso, arms and legs. They usually have one or sometimes two zippers down the front of the suit, sometimes additionally closed by a flap with velcro or buttons, and often have a belt at the waist. Sometimes, the suit has built-in suspenders on the inside for added support.

One-piece ski suits are often just made as a shell layer, with the skier adding warm underwear of own choice adapted to the current weather situation. Other suits may be padded for warmth, but when intended for skiing they are still not as insulated as a snowmobile suit. A new style of soft-shell ski suit became popular in the 2000s. Considered a smarter and more stylish option, with more stretch, warmth and comfort than hardshell fabrics offer whilst maintaining a high level of water resistance, wind resistance and breathability, these new suits are insulated with a fleece backing, avoiding the bulk of down-filled snowsuits, but still allowing room for layering. They also tend to be more affordable than hardshell Gore-Tex suits.

The first one-piece ski suit is said to have been designed by Italian Olympic skier and fashion designer Emilio Pucci in the late 1940s.

==== Race suits ====
Often referred to as race suits or speed suits, these are the suits worn by professional and junior racers at competitions to improve their speed. They are mostly made as one-piece suits. Made mostly of Polyurethane (85-90%) and Polyester (15-10%), these suits can reduce wind resistance by as much as fifty percent. Since wind resistance accounts for ninety-five percent of the force stopping skiers from going faster, wearing one of these suits can potentially give you nearly double the speed. They are very tight and form hugging and can take a while to adapt to the body. Olympic athletes can reach over 160 km/h in a race suit, while even a junior racer may struggle to get past 80 km/h without one. Suit costs range from $210 for a beginners suit to $1,200 for the suits generally worn by Olympic athletes.

Ski suits of this kind are not unisex garments due to the need to be skin tight and must be sized properly to be effective. Most athletes wear a base layer beneath their suit, but some may wear only the suit on race days, as the base layer will decrease the efficiency of the suit slightly.

=== Two-piece ski suits ===
==== Ski jacket ====
A ski jacket covers the arms and torso, sometimes just to the waist while other times reaching down over the buttocks. It can be a separate item or part of a two-piece ski suit together with matching ski pants.

From the introduction of ski jackets in the middle to late 1950s through the early 1980s, the dominant style was for a ski jacket to resemble a safari jacket in having a similar belt and shirt-like collar. A similar jacket, especially one with a hood, may also be called a parka, anorak, down jacket or winter shell.

==== Ski pants ====
Ski pants, also called salopettes, when part of a two-piece ski suit, are usually made in the same fabric and color as the corresponding ski jacket. It is sometimes in the form of bib-and-brace and the jacket is worn over it.

== Snowsuit events ==
In North America, there are many charity networks providing less fortunate children with snowsuits for the winter.

Ski suits and snow suits are a natural part of some sporting events. There are also some events which emphasize the use of the snowsuit as such. At the annual winter outdoor music festival Igloofest in Montreal in Canada, there is a contest for wearers of one-piece suits.

== See also ==
- Sportswear (activewear)
- Winter clothing
