= Snowmobile skipping =

Act of riding a snowmobile on liquid water surfaces

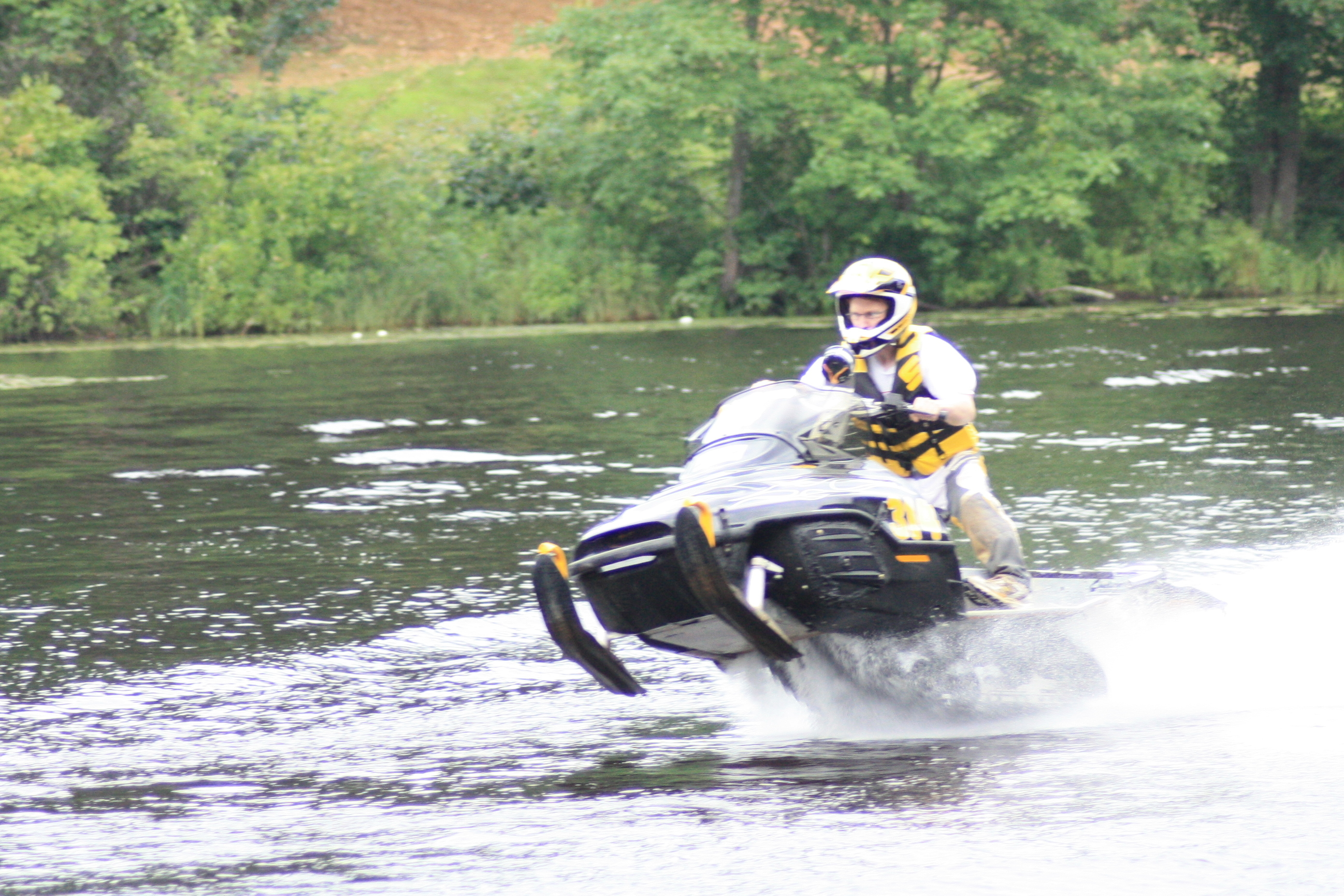
Position of the snowmobile while skipping

Snowmobile skipping, snowmobile watercross, snowmobile skimming, water skipping or puddle jumping is a sport and/or exhibition where snowmobile racers hydroplane their sleds across lakes or rivers.

== Basics ==
Snowmobile watercross consists of crossing water while riding a snowmobile, which is possible because snowmobiles have wide tracks for traction and flotation in the snow. If one hits the water at an adequate speed (5 mph per 150 lb or 12 km/h per 100 kg of weight) and keeps the sled's throttle open, the track keeps the snowmobile on the surface of the water without sinking. If the rider backs out of the throttle or the sled bogs or floods out, the sled will sink. A sunk sled is able to be revived by cleaning water out of the carburetor, exhaust, spark plugs, and replacing the fuel. The front of the sled is pitched upwards as riders commonly do in deep mountain powder snow.

== History ==
The Grantsburg, Wisconsin first annual World Championship Snowmobile Watercross was held in July 1977 and it has been held yearly on the third week of July since. The first race was simply held to see who could make it the 300 feet (91 m) from the island on Memory Lake to the shore. Most didn't, but the winner did go about 500 ft (150 m). In the years following, racers became more skilled and machines more powerful. Today, racers compete in drags and ovals, with an eight-lap championship run. Over 100 racers compete in the various classes. The Classes range from the beginners' Stock Drags to the top Pro-Open Ovals Class. Competitive watercross is run by two main circuits. The IWA (International Watercross Association) operates mainly in the Midwest, while the EWA (Eastern Watercross Association) operates in the Northeastern States.

In most cases, participants in watercross strip their snowmobiles of all non-essential parts—including the seat—to save weight.

On June 25, 2013, Antti Holmberg of Finland set the record for snowmobile skipping at 180 km (112 miles). On September 18, 2015, the record is now set at 212 km (131.731 miles) by the Norwegian Morten Blien.

== Safety ==
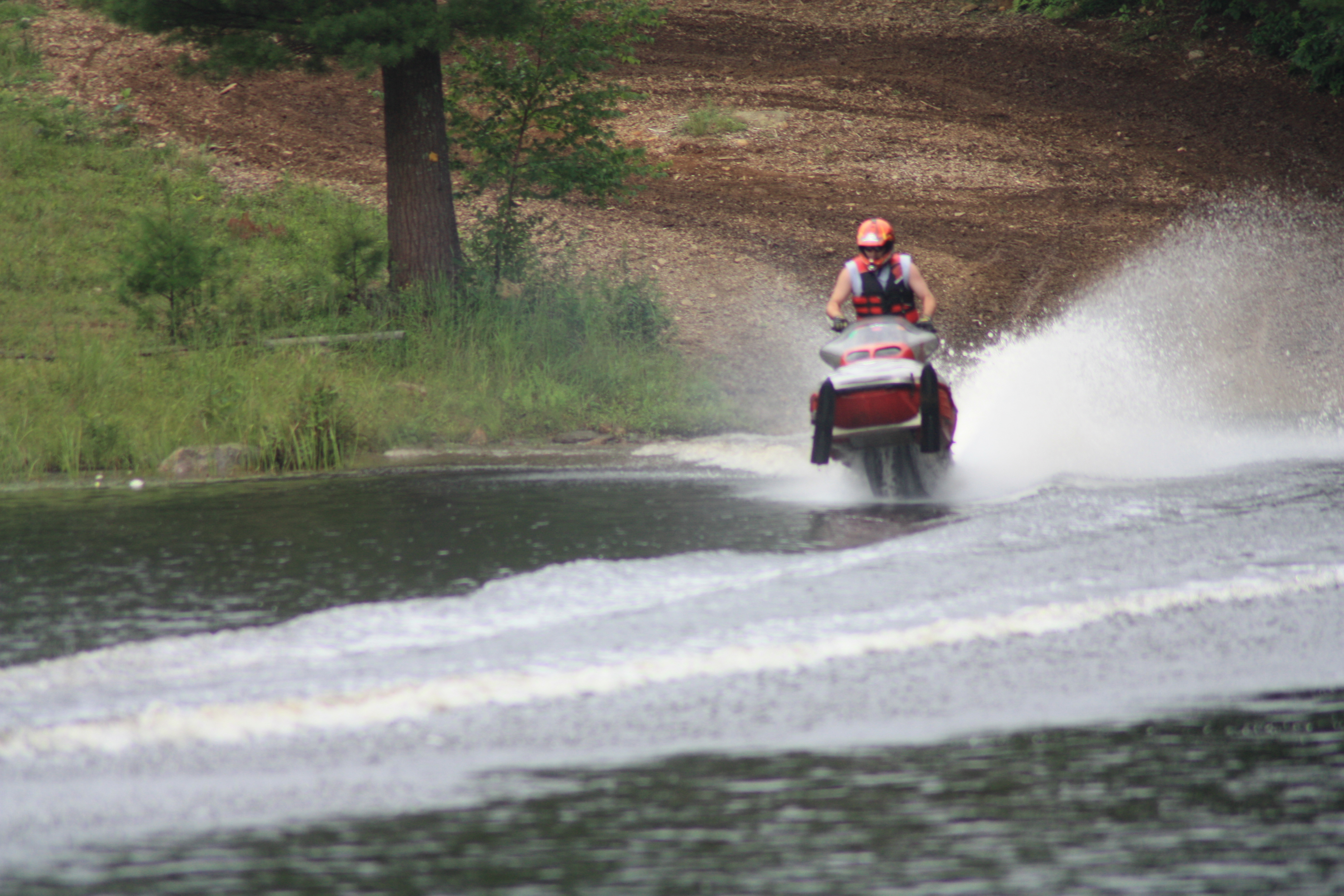
Snowmobile skipping right after leaving shore. Note the rider is wearing a life jacket

Watercross competitions are held during the summer and the participants of official events wear life jackets and helmets, and have a buoy tethered to their sleds. If for some event the rider and sled do not complete the course, the rider releases the buoy from the snowmobile so that it floats to the surface and marks the sled for retrieval. Watercross competitions, as with other motor sports competitions, have ambulance and rescue crews nearby in the event of an accident.

While it is possible to skim over the water with a stock snowmobile, the practice can be dangerous. For example, in February 2006, a Massachusetts man died in New Hampshire after sinking into the water during a failed skimming attempt. In July 2010, a 40-year-old man died in Anaktuvuk Pass while attempting to skim across Eleanor Lake. In January 2018, a 48-year-old man died after partially skipping across Sturgeon Lake (Ontario).

The practice of "skimming" is illegal in the states of Minnesota and Maine. On the contrary, in Wisconsin there are places where skimming is encouraged, and some businesses rely on it to attract customers, for example at Bauer's Dam in Conover, Wisconsin.
