= High-water mark (computer security) =

Concept in physical and logical security

In the fields of physical security and information security, the high-water mark for access control was introduced by Clark Weissman in 1969. It pre-dates the Bell–LaPadula security model, whose first volume appeared in 1972.

Under high-water mark, any object less than the user's security level can be opened, but the object is relabeled to reflect the highest security level currently open, hence the name.

The practical effect of the high-water mark was a gradual movement of all objects towards the highest security level in the system. If user A is writing a CONFIDENTIAL document, and checks the unclassified dictionary, the dictionary becomes CONFIDENTIAL. Then, when user B is writing a SECRET report and checks the spelling of a word, the dictionary becomes SECRET. Finally, if user C is assigned to assemble the daily intelligence briefing at the TOP SECRET level, reference to the dictionary makes the dictionary TOP SECRET, too.

== Low-water mark ==
Low-water mark is an extension to Biba Model. In the Biba model, no-write-up and no-read-down rules are enforced. In this model, the rules are exactly opposite of the rules in Bell-La Padula model. In the low-water mark model, read down is permitted, but the subject label, after reading, will be degraded to object label. It can be classified in floating label security models.

== See also ==
- Watermark (data synchronization)
