= Highmarking =

Highmarking or High-Marking is a popular activity performed by snowmobilers in mountainous terrain, where the snowmobile operator tries to ride as far up a steep mountain slope as possible, then turn around and come back down the hill without getting stuck, rolling the snowmobile or losing power.

This activity is extremely dangerous because optimum highmark terrain is typically in areas where avalanche danger is extremely high. Snowmobilers are the recreation group most likely to be killed in an avalanche, largely due to the activity of highmarking.

According to the Utah Avalanche Forecast Center, "Avalanche victims are almost exclusively backcountry recreationists--snowmobilers, climbers, snowboarders, snowshoers, skiers and hikers. Snowmobilers lead the list with twice the number of fatalities as any other activity."

Highmarking is the recreational maneuver of attempting to reach the highest point of a snow-covered feature such as a mountain, on a snowmobile. It refers to a specific activity in which the snowmobile operator's main goal is to accelerate and gain maximum elevation upon the face of a mountain before the machine reaches the top of the feature or upward progress is suddenly forced to diminish because of the grade of the feature, which gives the rider no choice but to turn around.

A High mark begins when a snowmobiler leaves an established trail and fully accelerates; blazing their own trail upward toward the summit of a snow-covered mountain face, ideally lying at a 30-45% grade. As the terrain gets steeper, the machine's acceleration slows down. At the apex of the elevation gained, the rider must sharply turn 180 degrees and descend the feature. The height of the arching track left in the snow by a pioneering rider usually sparks competition within members of a rider's party, urging the rest to surpass the height of the original arch, thus initiating a competition. High marks vary in their degrees of difficulty depending on the pitch of a given ascent and conditions of the snow.

Highmarking involves serious personal injury risk factors, most notably the danger of the rider triggering an avalanche and becoming buried in the ensuing cataclysm. According to , "Highmarking accounts for more than 63 percent of the avalanche fatalities involving snowmobilers in North America." Highmarking should only be attempted by snowmobilers who are equipped with avalanche transceivers and accompanied by other riders capable of detecting a distress signal and rescuing a buried snowmobiler.
