= Snowmobile suit =

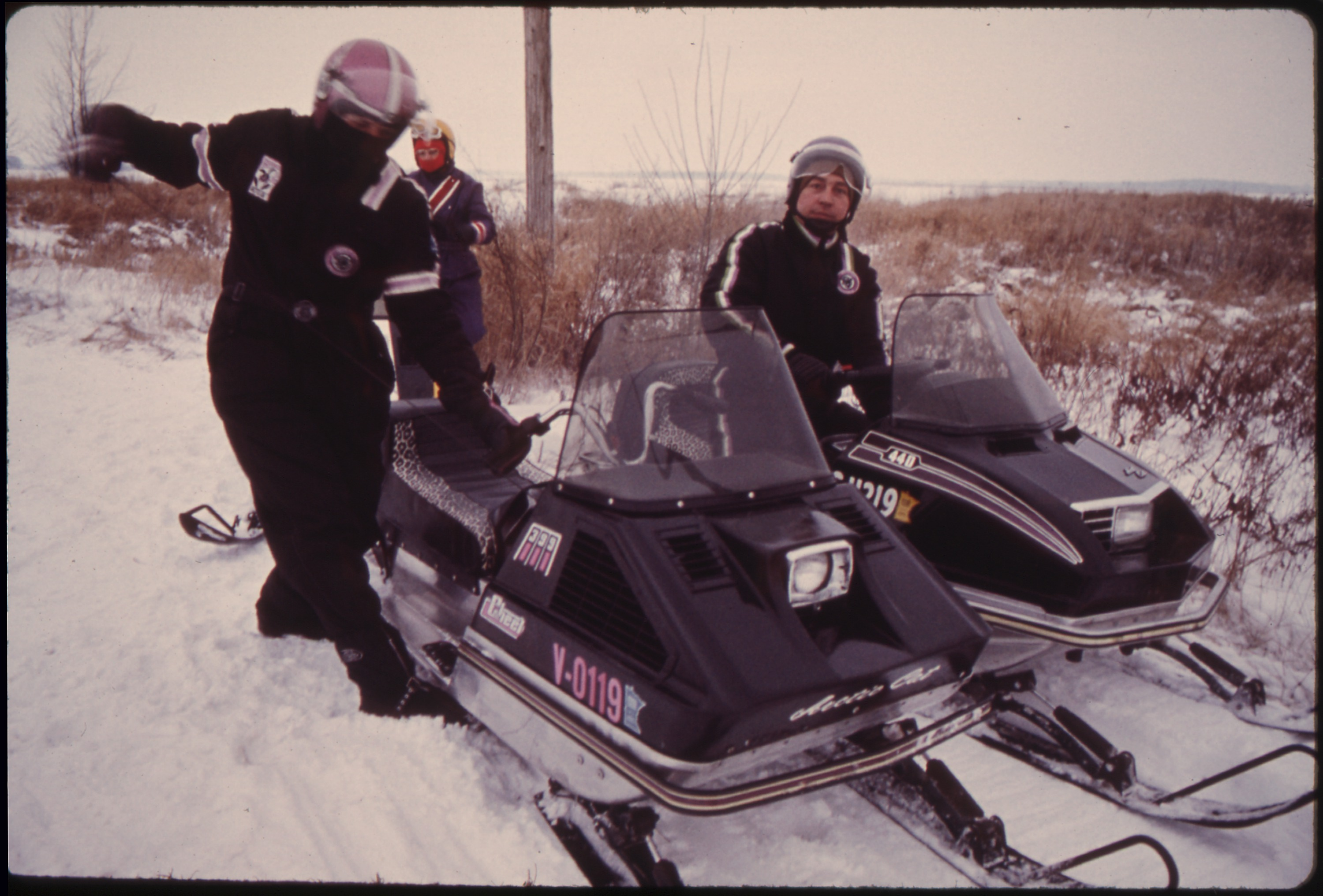
Snowmobile drivers wearing snowmobile suits in Minnesota

A snowmobile suit is a suit designed to be worn when riding a snowmobile. It is often similar to a one-piece snowsuit but specially made to not just insulate against snow and water but also to protect the rider from the wind while riding. The design often draws inspiration from both motorcycle suits and ski suits.

A snowmobile suit may be constructed as a one-piece, hybrid (jacket/pant with a zip-together function), or a two-piece garment. One-piece suits are typically warmer than two-piece suits, as air intrusion between jacket/pants is minimized.

Snowmobile suits may be uninsulated shells (meant to be worn over a base/mid layer), or may be fully insulated. The outer layers of snowmobile suits are usually a treated polyester, nylon, or may be leather. These outer layers are designed to be water resistant, as well as abrasion resistant.

One-piece suits may be constructed with a large zipper closure (#5, #8, #10 aluminum/plastic/waterproof), which may run the full length of the garment (neck to left/right ankle), or may have a centre/offset zipper that runs to the base of the torso, and have outer leg side zippers that run from the ankle to the knees, or hips. Two-piece suits will have a zipper front jacket, and pants with outer leg side zippers.

One-piece suits may contain a sewn-in suspender systems to aid in weight distribution of the garment, and to aid in wearer comfort. One- and two-piece suits will also contain features such as sewn in/removable hoods, many internal/external pockets, storm cuffs at wrist, and ankle (to minimize snow/air intrusion), and internal or external draft stopping flaps over the zippers.

Suits are constructed in many colours and patterns to suit the rider's preference. All contemporary snowmobile manufacturers make and sell branded suits as well. Suits will also contain safety features, such as the ability to keep the rider afloat, should they break through ice into water. Most suits will have some amount of reflective material on them, to allow the rider to be visible at night, or in low-light conditions.
