= Watermark (disambiguation) =

A watermark is a recognizable image or pattern in paper used to determine authenticity.

Watermark or watermarking may also refer to:

== Technology ==
- Digital watermarking, a technique to embed data in digital audio, images or video
  - Audio watermark, techniques for embedding hidden information into audio signals
- Watermark (data file), a method for ensuring data integrity which combines aspects of data hashing and digital watermarking
- Watermark (data synchronization), directory synchronization related programming terminology
- Watermarking attack, an attack on disk encryption methods

== Films ==
- Watermark (2013 film), a documentary film directed by Jennifer Baichwal and Edward Burtynsky
- Watermark (2003 film), an Australian film directed by Georgina Willis and produced by Kerry Rock.
- Watermarks (film), a 2004 documentary film about the Viennese Hakoah swim team

== Music ==
- Watermark (Art Garfunkel album), a 1977 album by Art Garfunkel
- Watermark (Enya album), a 1988 album by Enya
- Watermark (band), the CCM singing duo Nathan and Christy Nockels
- "Watermark", a song by Mae Moore from her 1995 album Dragonfly
- "Watermark", a song by The Weakerthans from their 2000 album Left and Leaving

== Organizations ==
- Watermark Inc., a radio syndication company
- Shenhua Watermark coal mine

== Other uses ==
- Watermark, a 1992 book by Joseph Brodsky

== See also ==
- Watermark, superimposed identifying digital on-screen graphic in video production
- High water mark (disambiguation)
