= Hell or High Water =

Hell or High Water may refer to:

== Film and television ==
- Hell or High Water (film), a 2016 American film
- "Hell or High Water" (Prison Break), an episode of Prison Break

== Music ==
- Hell or Highwater, the side-project of Atreyu's drummer Brandon Saller

=== Albums ===
- Hell or High Water (Tinsley Ellis album), 2002
- Hell or High Water (As Cities Burn album), 2009
- Hell or Highwater (album), by David Duchovny, 2015
- Come Hell or High Water, a 1994 live album by Deep Purple
- Come Hell or High Water (The Flowers of Hell album), 2009
- Hell or Highwater, by nothing,nowhere., 2024
- The Hell or High Water EP, by The Red Jumpsuit Apparatus, 2010

=== Songs ===
- "Hell or High Water", a song by AC/DC from the 1985 album Fly on the Wall
- "Hell or High Water", a song by Kiss from the 1987 album Crazy Nights
- "Hell or High Water", a song by Quiet Riot from the 1995 album Down to the Bone
- "Hell, or High Water", a song by Woe, Is Me from the 2010 album Numbers
- "Hell or High Water", a song by Bullet For My Valentine from the 2015 album Venom
- "Hell or High Water", a song by Passenger from the 2018 album Runaway
- "Hell or High Water", a song by Skid Row from the 2022 album The Gang's All Here
- "Hell or High Water", a song by Bailey Zimmerman from the 2024 film soundtrack Twisters: The Album
- "Hell or High Water", a song by Aventhis (an, AI Music Artist) from the 2025 album Dark Country Vol. 2

== Other uses ==
- Hell or high water clause, a contract clause

== See also ==
- Hell and High Water (disambiguation)
