= List of campus preachers =

Many American universities and colleges experience regular visits from itinerant campus preachers who typically occupy a prominent on-campus location for a day or two before moving on to another school.

== Preachers and locations ==
- Micah Armstrong – ("Brother Micah") frequent visitor to Florida State University and Florida Atlantic University.
- Gary Birdsong – North Carolina State University, UNC Chapel Hill, East Carolina University, University of North Carolina at Charlotte, Appalachian State University, etc.
- Brother Jed – travelled around the United States, visiting schools coast-to-coast. Jed had a wide range of media attention. In 2010, a critical documentary was made about him. In 2012, a satirical film was released based on his preaching at Cal State Long Beach.
- Brother Jim – primarily schools in Kentucky, Indiana, Ohio, and surrounding area
- Tom Short – national ministry, sponsored by Great Commission Churches, based out of Columbus, OH.
- Michael Peter Woroniecki – no permanent base or sponsorship by organized religion. Depends on donations sent through mail from converts, sympathetic observers and income from their six now adult children. Preaches mostly at campuses throughout the contiguous United States. Other preaching destinations have included Canada, Hawaii, Europe, Morocco, Central and South America. Traveling itinerary is often undisclosed.
- Sister Cindy - national ministry, widow of Brother Jed
