= Sleeveless shirt =

Upper body garment without sleeves

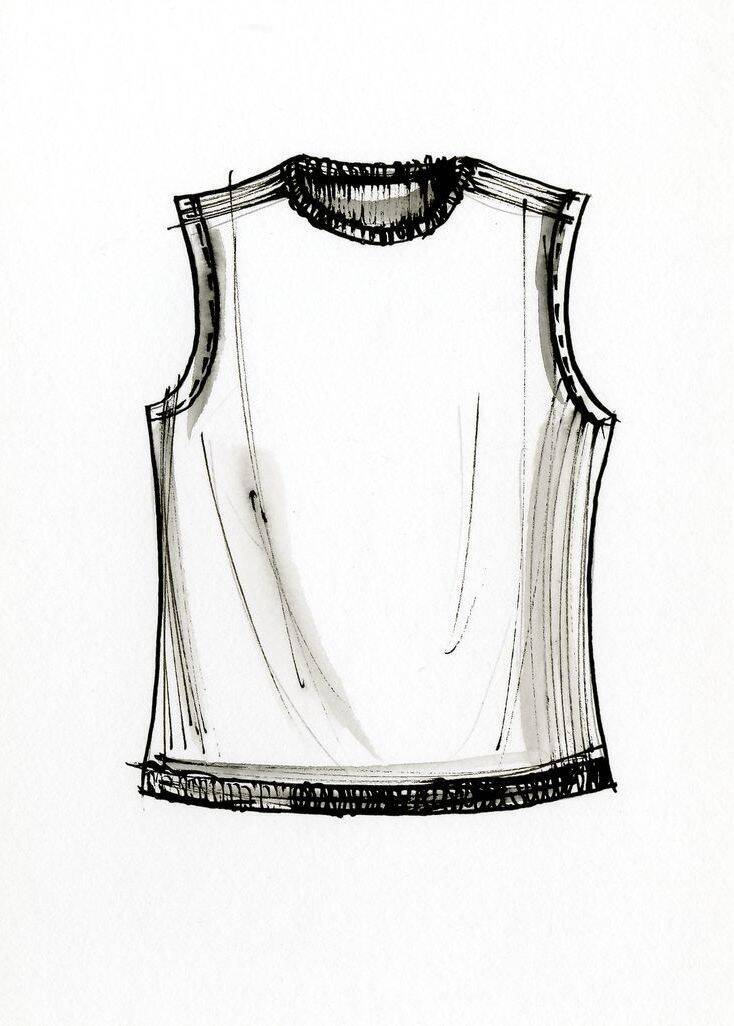
- Sketch of a sleeveless shirt
- Type: T-shirt without sleeves
- Material: Fabric

A sleeveless shirt, also known as a tank top, "wife beater", among other names, is a shirt that is manufactured without sleeves or with sleeves that have been cut off. Depending on the style, they can be worn as undershirts, by athletes in sports such as track and field and triathlon, or as casual wear by both men and women.

== Types ==
=== Tank top ===
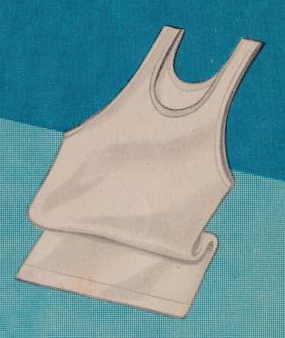
Tank top from a 1950s Chinese advertisement

In the United States and Canada, any casual sleeveless shirt can be called tank top or tank shirt, with several specific varieties. The upper garment is worn commonly by both men and women. The build of a tank top is simple: the neck and armholes are often reinforced for durability. Tank tops for men often have large armholes and neck holes, which may reach down as far as the bottom of the chest; particularly low armholes are referred to as "dropped armholes." Women's tank tops have smaller holes, to conceal their breasts. They are also sometimes made long to make tucking into pants easier. In almost all cases, they are buttonless, collarless, and pocketless.

A sleeveless T-shirt, also called a muscle shirt, is the same design as a T-shirt, but without sleeves. Some sleeveless T-shirts, which possess smaller, narrower arm holes, are traditionally worn by both women and men. They are often worn during athletic activities or as casual wear during warmer weather. They were quite popular in the 1980s and were commonly associated with surfers and bodybuilders (hence the name "muscle" shirt) and often bore the names and logos of gyms. Such shirts without logos are now more commonly worn as casual wear.

In addition to athletic usage, tank tops have traditionally been used as undershirts, especially with suits and dress shirts. They are sometimes worn alone without a dress shirt or top shirt during very warm and/or humid weather. Tank tops are often worn alone under very casual settings, as lounge wear, and/or while completing yard work or other chores around the home. Ribbed tank tops are also used for layering during colder weather.

In the UK, especially when used as an undershirt, it is known as a vest (compare the American usage of vest). It is called a singlet in Australia and New Zealand, and a banian, banyan or ganji in the Indian subcontinent. A uniquely Australian variation is the "Jackie Howe", in particular referring to navy blue examples, named after the famous 19th century shearer of the same name, who according to legend was wearing one when he shore 321 sheep in a day with hand shears, a world record that still stands. In the Philippines, a sleeveless undershirt is called a sando.

The tank top designed for a tight fit and often made of ribbed cotton is also called an A-shirt, short for athletic shirt. Other slang terms include wifebeater, beater, guinea tee or dago tee (guinea and dago being American ethnic slurs for people of Italian ethnicity).

=== Etymology ===
The tank top is named after tank suits, one-piece bathing suits of the 1920s worn in tanks or swimming pools.

Marlon Brando's abusive character in the 1951 movie "A Streetcar Named Desire" wore a dirty tank top to over-sexualize the character and draw connotations to wild animals. Other notable instances of using this costume choice to draw attention to a character's working-class or even criminal background include Warren Beatty in "Bonnie and Clyde" (1967), James Caan in "The Godfather" (1972) and Sylvester Stallone in "Rocky" (1976). One early reference to calling the tank top a "wife beater" is in a 1979 San Francisco Examiner article by John Van der Zee. In current usage the term "wife beater" is considered derogatory and heteronormative.

In 2005, Paul Davidson, a filmmaker, made a blog post in which he claimed that the term "wifebeater" had evolved from a medieval chain mail undergarment called a "waif-beater", and this was picked up as fact by other outlets. In the same blog post, he claimed that the term became synonymous with an undershirt after a Detroit man was reportedly arrested in 1947 for beating his wife to death. The story claims that newspapers printed a photo of the "wife beater" wearing a stained undershirt. This claim was repeated by numerous outlets. However, no evidence has been found in news archives to substantiate this rumor. Davidson openly admitted in 2018 that the blog post was a hoax, created to trick people who unquestioningly believed anything they read on the Internet.

=== Camisole ===
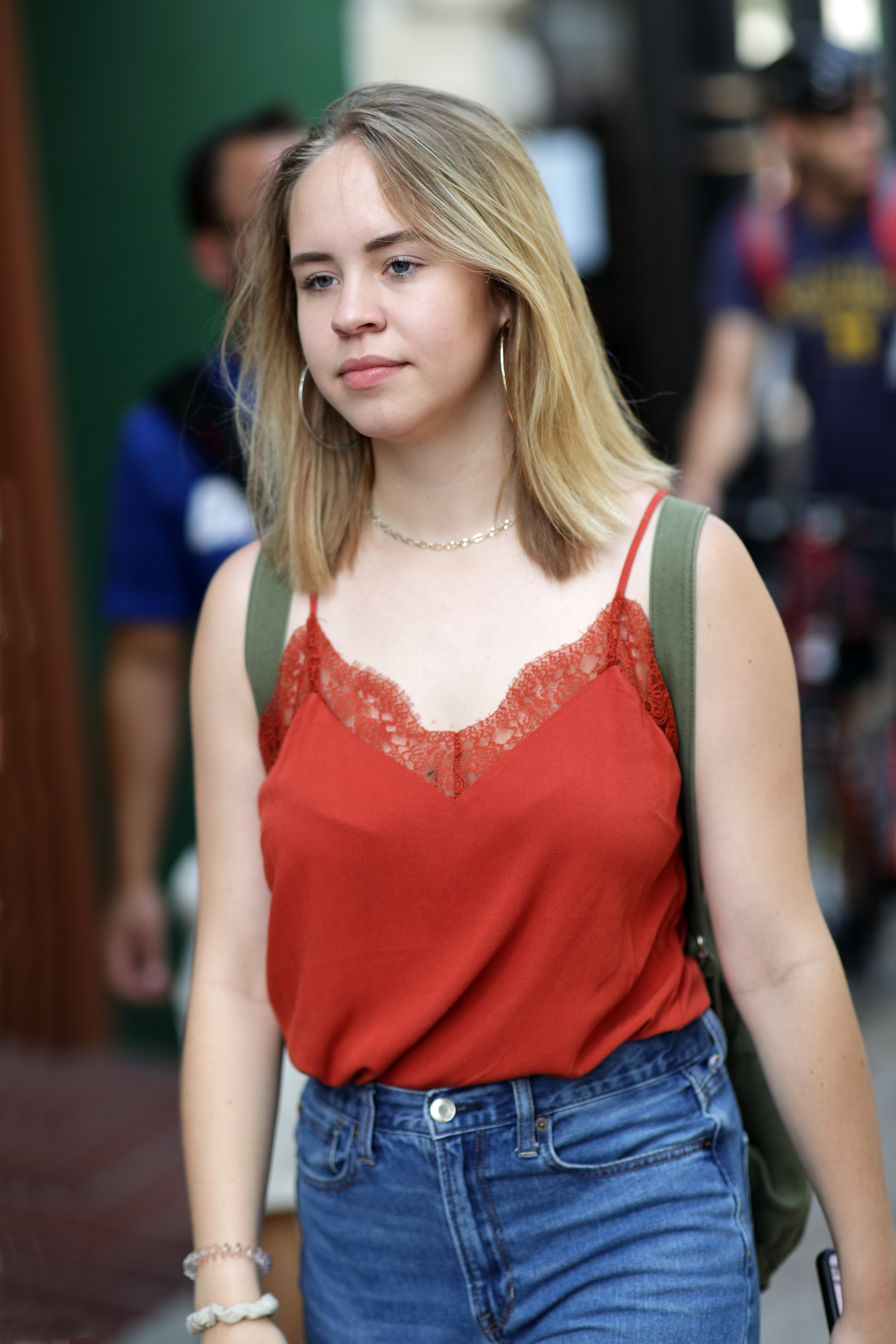
A camisole as outerwear.

A camisole, also abbreviated to simply cami, is a sleeveless shirt worn traditionally by women, normally extending to the waist. Camisoles often have spaghetti straps. Originally worn as an undershirt, like the A-shirt, they have become increasingly used as outerwear.

Historically, camisole referred to jackets of various kinds, including overshirts (worn under a doublet or bodice), women's négligées, and sleeved jackets worn by men. In modern usage, a camisole or cami is a loose-fitting sleeveless undershirt which covers the top part of the body but is shorter than a chemise. A camisole normally extends to the waist but is sometimes cropped to expose the midriff, or extended to cover the entire pelvic region.

Camisoles are manufactured from light materials, commonly cotton-based, occasionally satin or silk, or stretch fabrics such as lycra, nylon, or spandex. The camisole is usually made of satin, nylon, or cotton.

=== Dudou ===
A dudou (Chinese: 肚兜; lit. 'belly cover'), known as a yếm in Vietnamese contexts, is an item of East Asian and Southeast Asian clothing resembling a silk apron or bib but traditionally used as an undershirt or bodice to flatten the figure and, medicinally, to preserve stomach qi. Beginning around the year 2000, Western and Chinese fashion has also begun incorporating them as a sleeveless and backless shirt for women.

=== Halter top ===
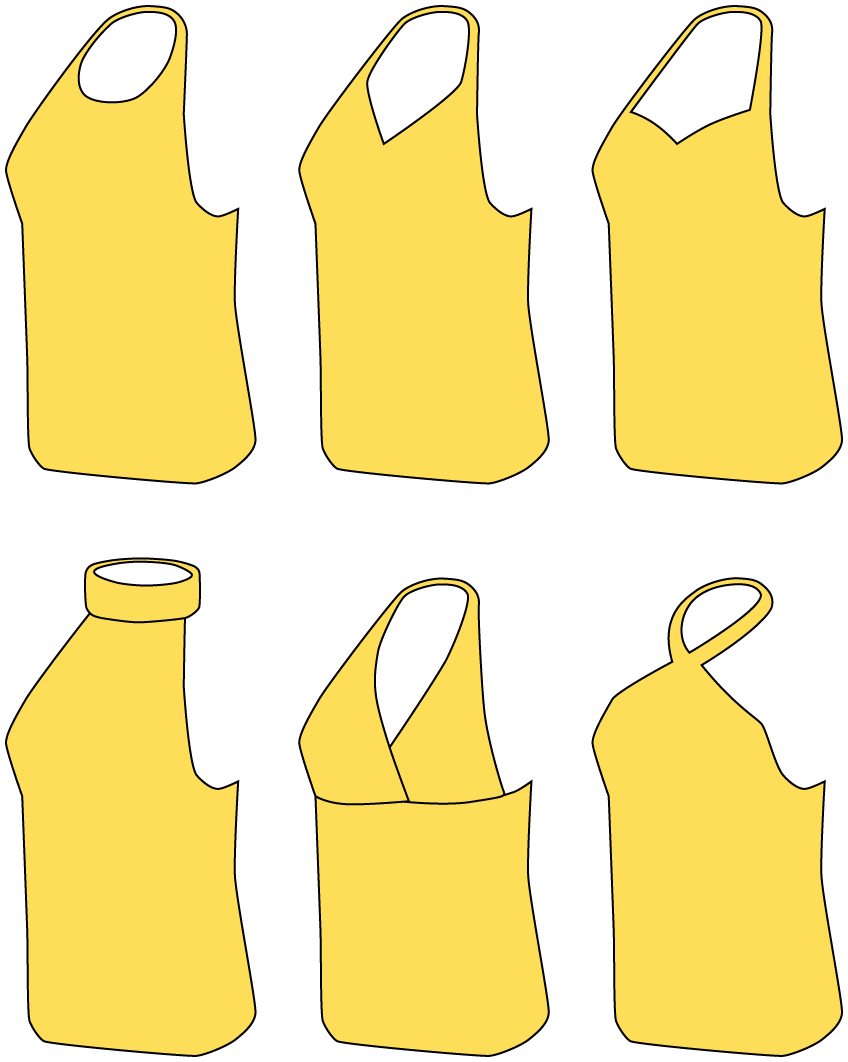
Examples of halterneck styles

A halter top is a sleeveless shirt in which a strap goes around the back of the neck, leaving the upper back uncovered. Halter tops are worn mainly by girls and women.

=== Tube top ===
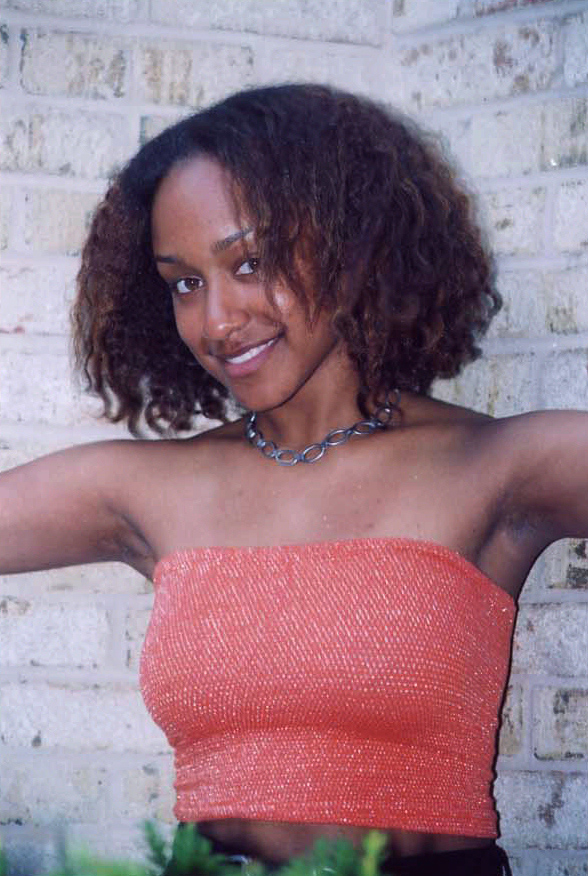
Tube top

A tube top is a shirt with no sleeves or shoulders, essentially a tube that wraps around the wearer's torso. Some versions cover most of the torso while others leave a large midriff. In British and Australian English, they are informally known as boob tubes.
