= Smock (surname) =

Smock is a surname. Notable people with the surname include:

- Amanda Smock (born 1982), American track and field athlete
- Cindy Smock, more commonly known as Sister Cindy (born 1959), American campus preacher and widow of Jed
- Ginger Smock (1920–1995), American musician and television personality
- Jed Smock (1943–2022), American evangelist
- John Conover Smock (1842–1926), American geologist
- Matthias Smock, American settler in New Jersey, namesake of Matthias Smock House
- Pamela Smock (born 1961), American sociologist and demographer
- Raymond W. Smock (born 1941), American historian
- Rose Smock (1867–1946), American actress
- Robert Smock (1908–1986), American agricultural scientist
- Trent Smock (born 1954), American basketball player
