= Smock =

Smock may refer to:

- Smock-frock, a coat-like outer garment, often worn to protect the clothes
- Smocking, an embroidery technique
- Chemise, a woman's undergarment
- Smock mill, a windmill with a wooden tower, resembling the garment in appearance
- Ghanaian smock, a shirt worn in Ghana
- Smock (surname), a list of people with the name
