= Micah Armstrong =

American evangelist

- Micah Armstrong (right), with his wife Elizabeth (left), at Florida Atlantic University in January 2007.
- Other name: Brother Micah
- Citizenship: American
- Occupation: Preacher
- Known for: Christian fundamentalist open-air preaching in U.S. college campuses
- Spouse: Elizabeth Armstrong
- Website: https://brothermicah.wordpress.com

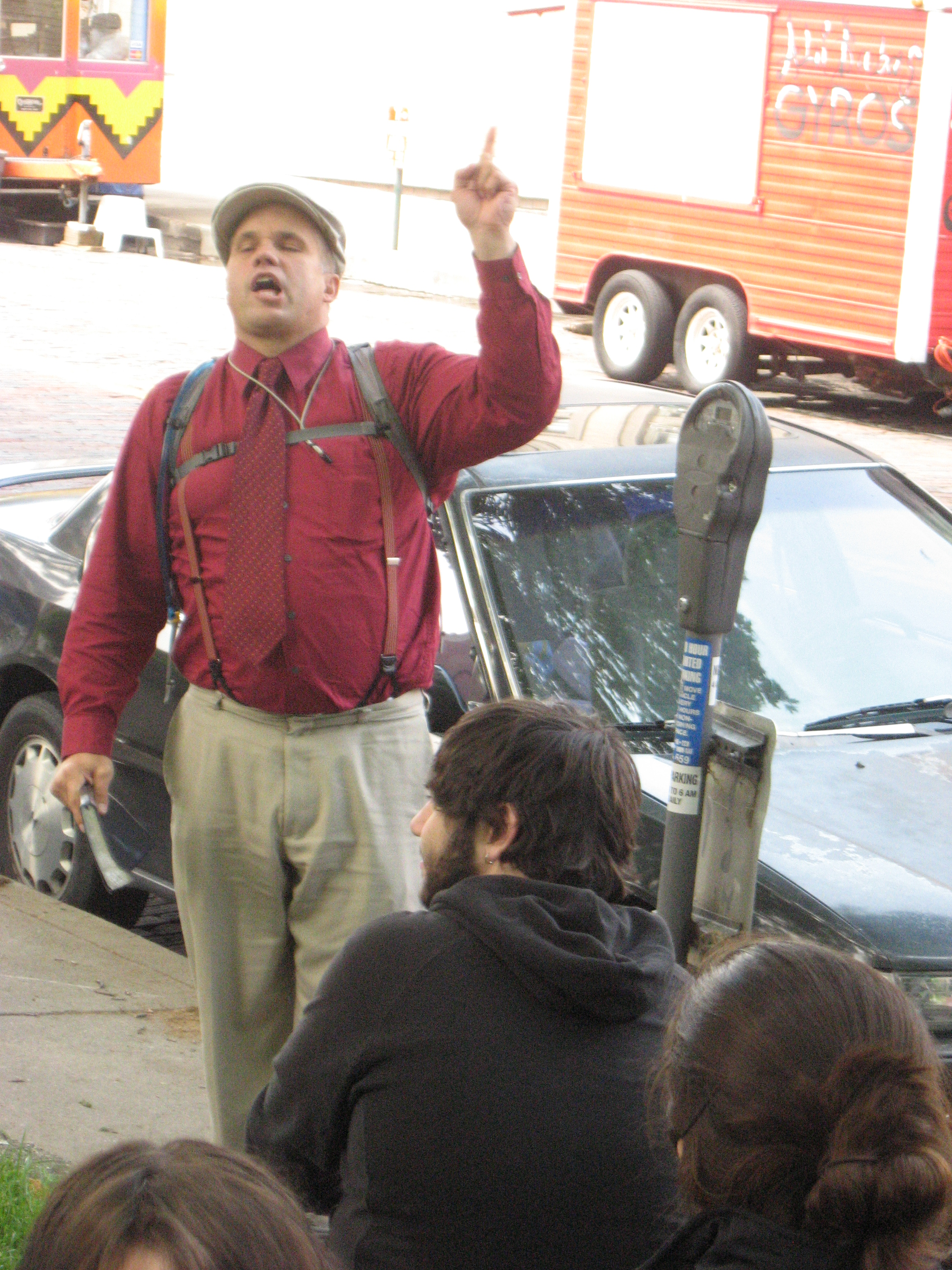
Students confront Armstrong at Ohio University (2009)

Micah Armstrong, also known as Brother Micah, is an American Trinitarian Pentecostal evangelist who preaches publicly at universities. He began his campus ministries full-time in 2006, however he visited campuses in his spare time as early as 2004, with visits also possibly occurring as early as the mid-1990s. Armstrong travels with his wife Elizabeth preaching in circuits mostly in the eastern and southern parts of the United States. Armstrong uses outrageous statements to spark heated discussions. According to Jay Reeves of the Associated Press, Armstrong "holds a near mythic status on college campuses across the eastern United States". On December 1, 2013, Jesse Morrell's OpenAirOutreach.com, published a documentary film on Armstrong's personal life and preaching.

== Beliefs ==
Armstrong speaks out against sex outside of the biblical context of marriage, drugs, rock and roll, masturbation, smoking, and pornography. He calls himself a "homophobe" and performs a song entitled, The Homo Song. He refers to “real Muslims" as terrorists. On the subject of women, Armstrong has said, "Women have two places: In front of the sink and behind the vacuum." He believes one can lose their salvation and must work to maintain it by stopping sinning/repenting from sinning and trusting in Jesus Christ. In 2009, he debated Mike Sprott, a Baptist campus ministry leader and pastor, at the University of South Florida campus, on confrontational open air preaching and the message of repentance and holiness.

Armstrong's preaching is criticized within some Christian circles. Brother Micah and Sister Elizabeth frequently preach against homosexuality, masturbation, and premarital sex, in a way that critics find confrontational. Armstrong calls male critics who challenge his preaching on homosexuality sodomites, and has said that sorority girls put whorehouses out of business by giving away free sex. Micah claims to be sinless (an unorthodox view called sinless perfectionism).

He commonly toured with Brother Jed and Sister Cindy.
