= Teddy (garment) =

Type of garment

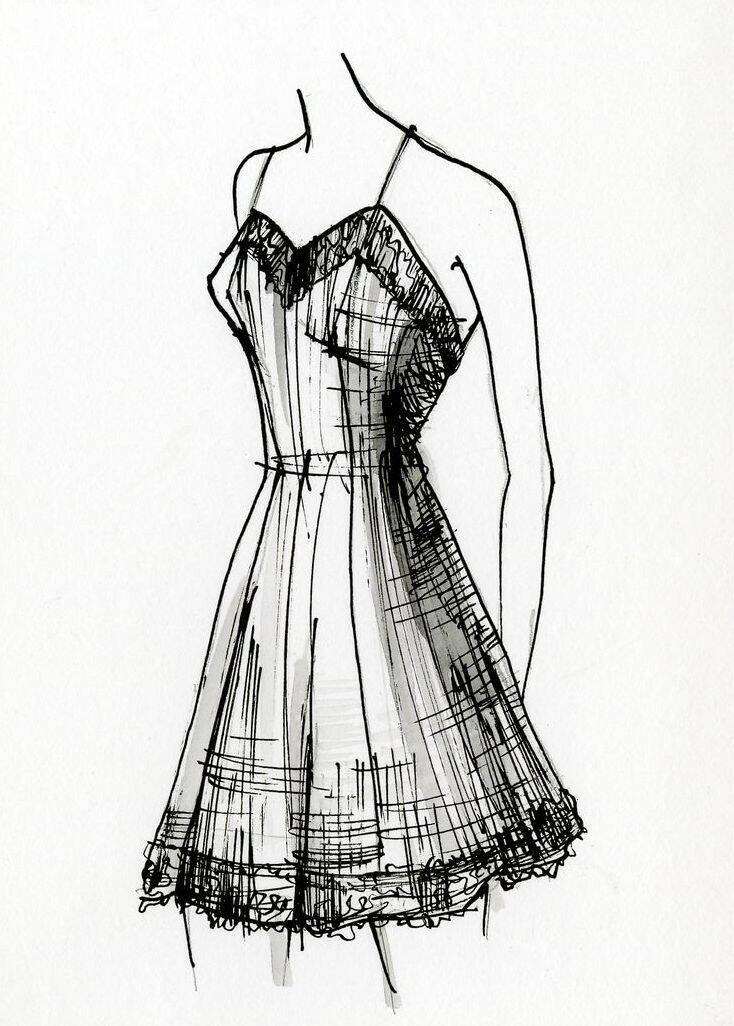
Camiknickers

A teddy, also called a camiknicker, is a garment which covers the torso and crotch in the one garment. It is a similar style of garment to a one-piece swimsuit or bodysuit, but is typically looser and sheerer. The garment is put on by stepping into the leg holes and pulling the garment up to cover the torso. It may cover the whole of the torso or partially and may also cover the arms. They may open at the crotch so that the wearer may use the bathroom without taking it completely off. As an undergarment, it combines the functions of a camisole and panties, and may be preferred to avoid a visible panty line. It is also found as lingerie.

== History ==
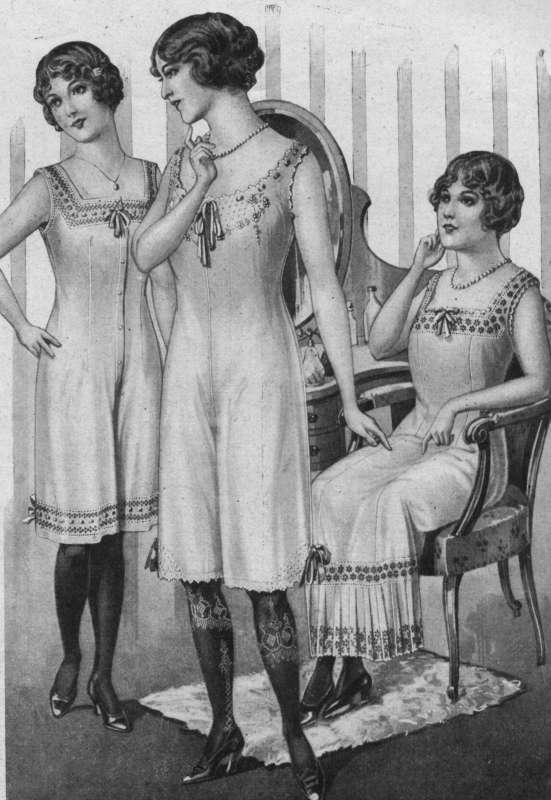
Ladies' underwear advertisement, 1913

The modern-day teddy has its origins as an adult’s undergarment in the 19th century apparently named after German-American clothing manufacturer Theodore Bear (c. 1864-1902).

Originally known as combinations, an 1862 patent introduced men’s one-piece vest and drawers made up of knitted woollen cloth, which were popularly worn from the 1880s.

As a women’s undergarment, combinations comprised chemise and drawers, and could be fashioned from various different fabrics including silk, linen, cotton, or wool. This style had an opening to either the front or back, and could also have buttons to the hips onto which petticoats could be attached. First introduced in 1877, women’s combinations were initially developed to reduce bulk under new styles and silhouettes of outer clothing, with darts and seams providing a closer fitting undergarment. While many styles were sleeveless and had a low-neckline, options also featured long sleeves and/or high necklines, and into the 1890s, were also decorated with ribbons and lace.

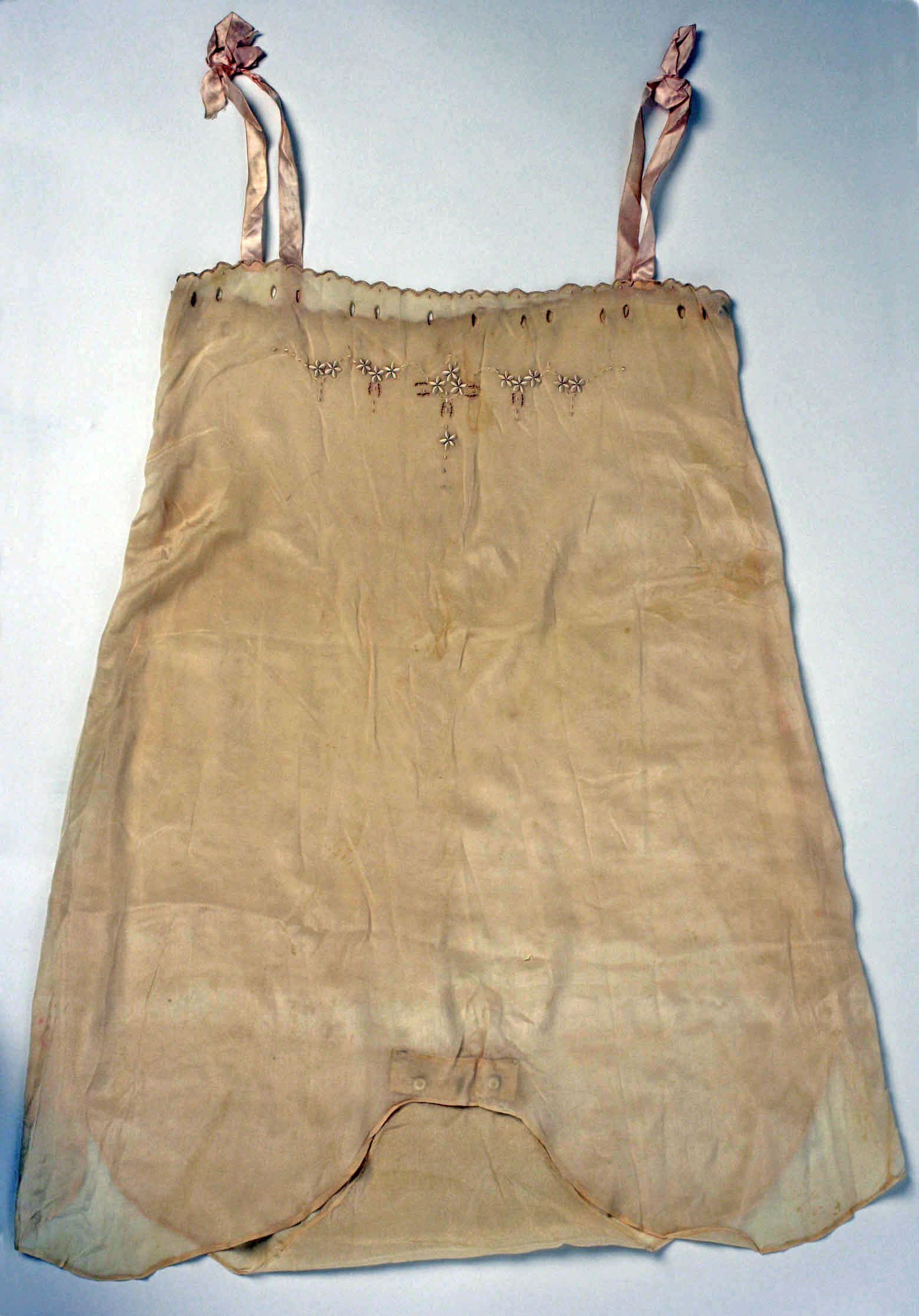
Teddy, French, silk, c.1920s. The Metropolitan Museum of Art Costume Institute, 1986.516.7.

A one-piece undergarment which combined a camisole and knickers appeared in the 1910s under the name envelope chemise or chemi-knickers, soon referred to as camiknickers. The style remained fashionable into the 1920s, with examples being referred to as step-ins, combinations, camiknickers, cami-combinations, or cami-bockers at this time.

The camiknicker style retained popularity during World War II when women who served in military-related duties wore trousers instead of skirts. By the late 1940s, the garment lost its popularity.

A version reappeared in the late 1960s, called a braslip, which featured a bra top and attached slip, to wear under short, shift dresses, and replace half slips. Often the bra top was an underwire style, and the entire garment was sized by the bra.

From the 1970s the term teddy or teddie was adopted to refer to a similar style of undergarment. Made from silk or similar weighted synthetic fabric, a teddy had developed into a lightweight bodice with attached underwear, often with button or press-stud fastenings to the gusset.

Another revival began in the 1980s and 1990s, under the name "teddy" or "bodysuit", when the garment was made of spandex, featuring brief construction combining features of a bra and panties, or leotard, and brighter colors.

== Modern teddy styles ==
Most modern teddies are either designed for visual or sex appeal, or as practical clothing. Common styles include:

=== Bareback teddy ===
A bareback teddy is one with an open back, often designed with built-in bust support.

=== Body briefer teddy ===
A body briefer is a form-fitting garment which smooths and shapes the wearer's figure. They typically come in a variety of control levels, achieved by using different materials or thicknesses things of materials in the body areas they are designed to control. Like sleep teddies, body briefers tend to use simpler materials and styles than teddies designed for visual appeal. Body briefers are also commonly referred to as "body shapers" or "women's shapers".

=== Fashion top teddy ===
A fashion top teddy combines a thong or T-front thong panty, bra and fashion top. Fashion top teddies come in a wide variety of styles, from simple styles with plain materials to very fancy styles with beads, crystals or sequins. Fashion top teddies can be worn as fancy undergarments or as an outer garment without a top over them.

=== Sleep teddy ===
A sleep teddy is a loose-fitting teddy designed as sleepwear. A sleep teddy is a practical garment which tends to use simpler materials and styles.

=== Teddiette ===
A teddiette is a teddy with detachable garters.

=== Traditional teddy ===
A traditional teddy is a loose-fitting teddy designed for visual or sex appeal and to show off the wearer's figure. Traditional teddies often use sheer or partially sheer material.
