= Sister Cindy =

American street preacher

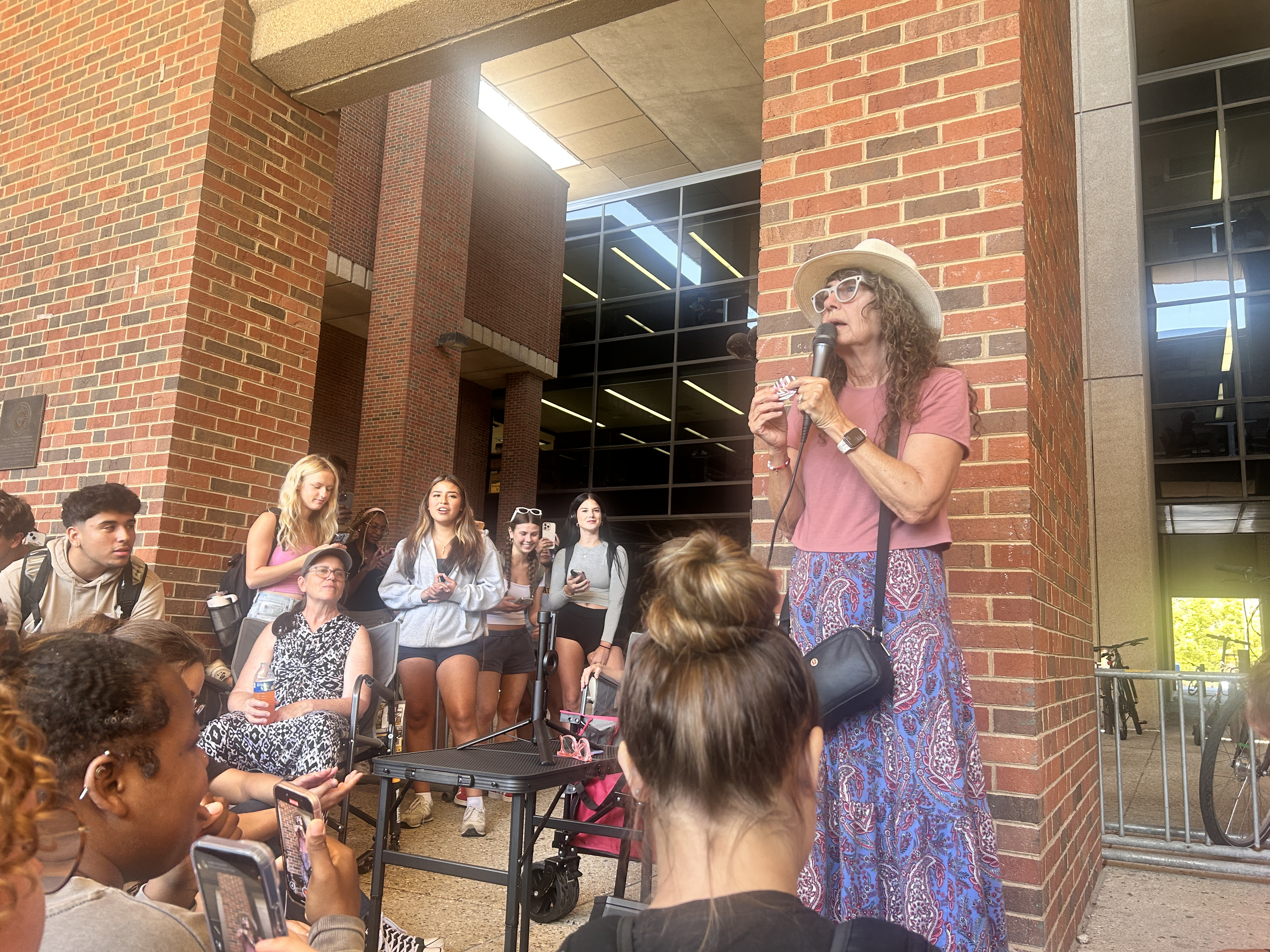
- Smock preaching on the campus of the University of Wisconsin Milwaukee in 2025
- Born: Cynthia D. Lasseter; 1959 or 1960 (age 66–67)
- Other name: Sister Cindy
- Occupation: Campus preacher
- Years active: 1979–present

Cynthia D. Smock (née Lasseter, born 1959 or 1960), commonly known as Sister Cindy, is an American evangelist known for her itinerant, open-air preaching on college campuses across the United States. Smock began preaching in 1979 after meeting fellow evangelist Jed Smock, better known as Brother Jed. Together, they founded Campus Ministry USA and undertook nation-wide college evangelism tours.

After Jed's death in 2022, Smock continued preaching. Her sermons frequently touch on sexual immorality and employ rhetoric against fornication, homosexuality, illicit substances, and pornography.

== Early life ==
Cindy Lasseter was born in 1959 or 1960. Cindy Lasseter's parents divorced when she was three years old, with Smock being raised by her father, who Smock described as "very loving" in an interview with Ohio University's The New Political. She remained in contact with her mother as well. She described her upbringing as "a normal American childhood, but no faith in Christ or church."

Smock attended the University of Florida in Gainesville, Florida, United States, and pursued a degree in journalism. It was there that she attended a sermon by itinerant evangelical minister Brother Jed in 1977. According to Smock, she made fun of Jed's preaching, to which Jed told her to repent. Jed would frequently call her the "Disco Queen," for her love of dancing. The following year, Brother Jed returned to campus, and Smock, now a junior, invited him to dinner with the intention of "seducing" him, with Brother Jed turning down her advances, instead inviting her to Christianity. Smock accepted.

== Preaching career ==
Smock began preaching on the University of Florida campus in February 1979, before traveling to campuses with Jed in May that year.

Smock gained virality on social media for her "Ho No Mo" campaign, imploring students to practice abstinence and to turn away from homosexuality through, in her own words, "good old-fashioned slut shaming." Smock has also targeted drugs and pornography in her sermons. Smock's ministry has been branded as misogynistic and homophobic and has been the subject of controversy.

Smock also runs an active YouTube channel and hosts bible studies over Zoom. She has over 400 thousand followers and over nine million likes on TikTok, and runs a Cameo, where fans pay for custom video messages.

== See also ==
- List of campus preachers
