= Arnol Kox =

Dutch street preacher (1952–2020)

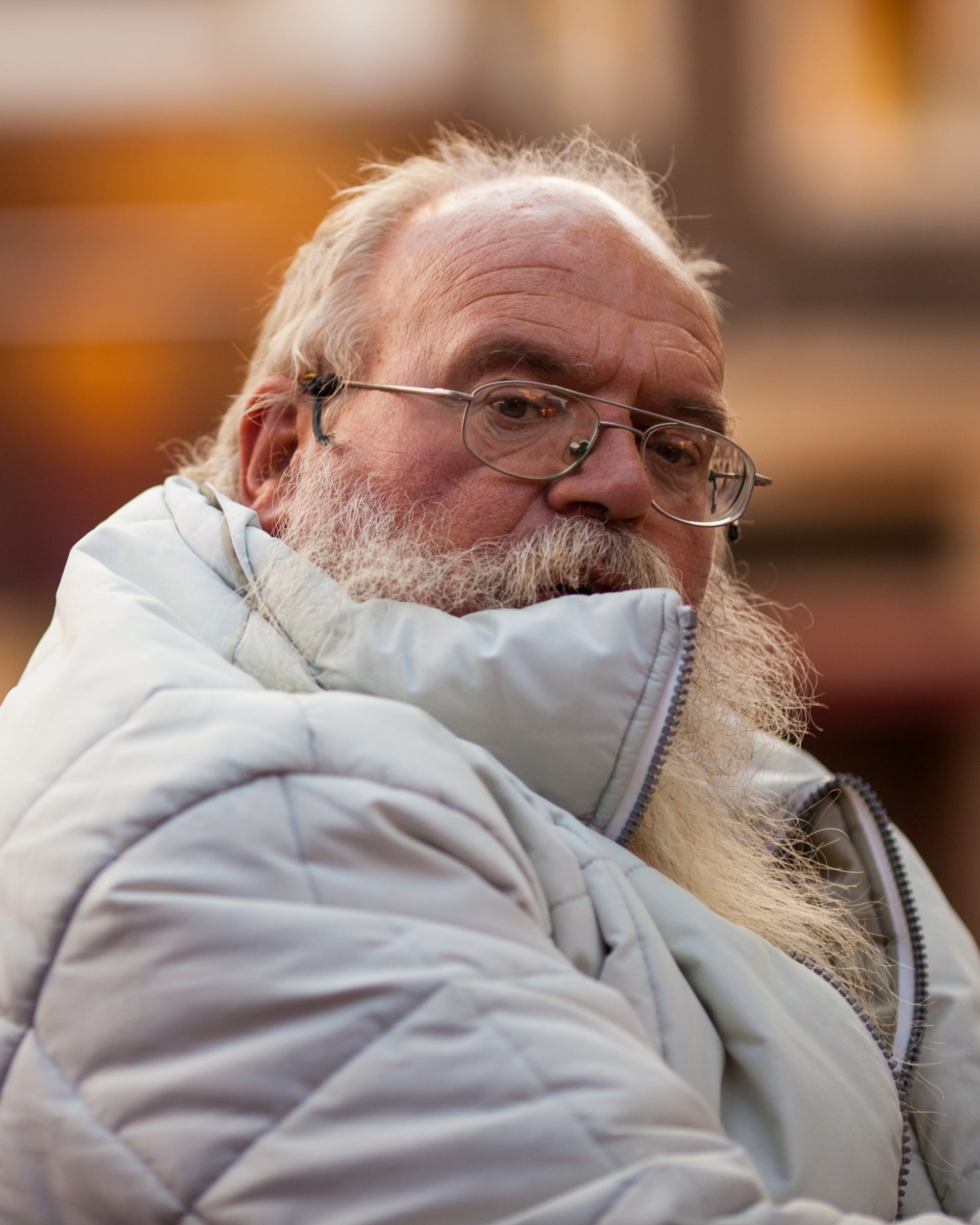
- Kox in 2012
- Born: 11 October 1952; Bergeijk, Netherlands
- Died: 15 July 2020 (aged 67); Eindhoven, Netherlands
- Occupation: Street preacher

Arnol Kox (11 October 1952 – 15 July 2020) was a Dutch street preacher.

Over 40 years Kox preached the Christian faith on the streets of central Eindhoven. Kox regularly went to court. Angry shopkeepers tried to stop his preaching in court in 2008, but the court acquitted him. In 2000, he married Gerry Diederen, a German teacher from Kerkrade. He was once again warned in March 2009 that he would be repeatedly fined for noise complaints. Other court appearances and charges were placed against him, including for "feeding the pigeons".

As of 2010, Kox's health deteriorated. Three years later, he suffered a heart attack on the street, and leukemia was diagnosed in 2019. On 5 July, Kox made a final tour through Eindhoven's city center. The Eindhoven alderman Yassin Torunglu organized a card campaign for the city preacher. Kox received a total of 250 cards from all over the country.

Kox died at the hospital in Eindhoven on 15 July 2020, aged 67, due to leukemia.
