= State Street Preacher =

American street preacher

Samuel Chambers
- Born: May 22, 1938 (age 88); Mississippi
- Other names: State Street Preacher, Old Navy Preacher
- Occupation: Evangelist
- Years active: 1960s - present
- Organization: Church of God in Christ
- Known for: Street preaching
- Children: 8
- Website: Gumbo Gospel Truth

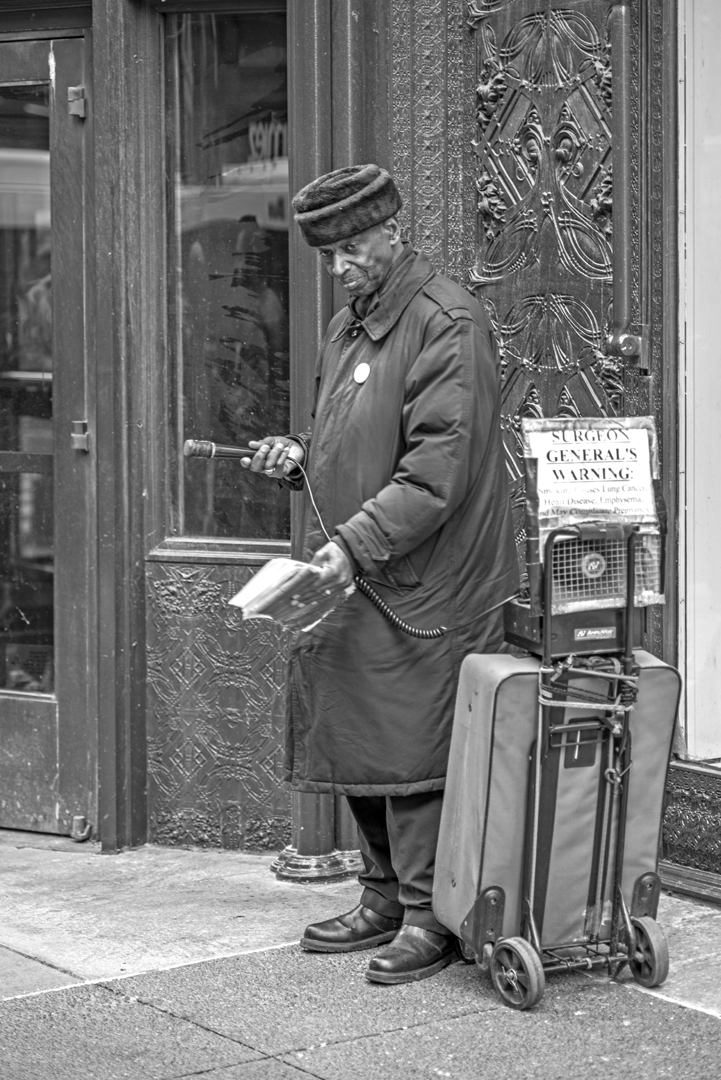
Samuel Chambers preaching on State Street.

Samuel Chambers (born May 22, 1938), better known by his nickname The State Street Preacher is an American Holiness Pentecostal evangelist and street preacher. Chambers has been a fixture on Chicago's State Street since 1969, usually seen preaching for up to 8 hours a day, six days a week. Chambers' preaching has been controversial, particularly because he frequently tells people they are going to Hell.

Chambers was born in Mississippi. He claims that when he was 13, God appeared to him in a dream and instructed him to spread God's word to the people. Chambers began preaching on State Street around 1969 and as of 2004, claimed to preach "from 12:30 or so until 8:30 or nine o'clock, 6 days a week, sometimes 7." Chambers initially began preaching at the intersection of State and Madison but later moved a block north to intersection of State and Washington Street, usually standing in front of the Marshall Field and Company Building or an Old Navy store (which moved in 2012). Chambers also is a pastor at High Way Church of God in Christ and is married with eight children.

Chambers has been a controversial figure during his preaching career. Chambers is strongly opposed to homosexuality, premarital sex, smoking and crossdressing and frequently tells people he suspects of engaging in these activities that they are going to Hell. Chambers also preaches that women's primary purpose is to have children and obey men. Chambers' preaching is unpopular with many, and he has been subject to violence on multiple occasions, claiming that people have spit on him, maced him, and threatened him with violence. He reported that in one incident someone attempted to burn his clothes while he was wearing them. Chambers was assaulted by two men on May 21, 2014, but declined medical treatment and returned to preach the following day, telling reporters he was ready to forgive the attackers.

After a Donald Trump rally was canceled due to protests in Chicago, a meme of Chambers went viral in response to claims that people in Chicago did not respect free speech.
