= Gary Birdsong =

American preacher

Gary Eugene Birdsong
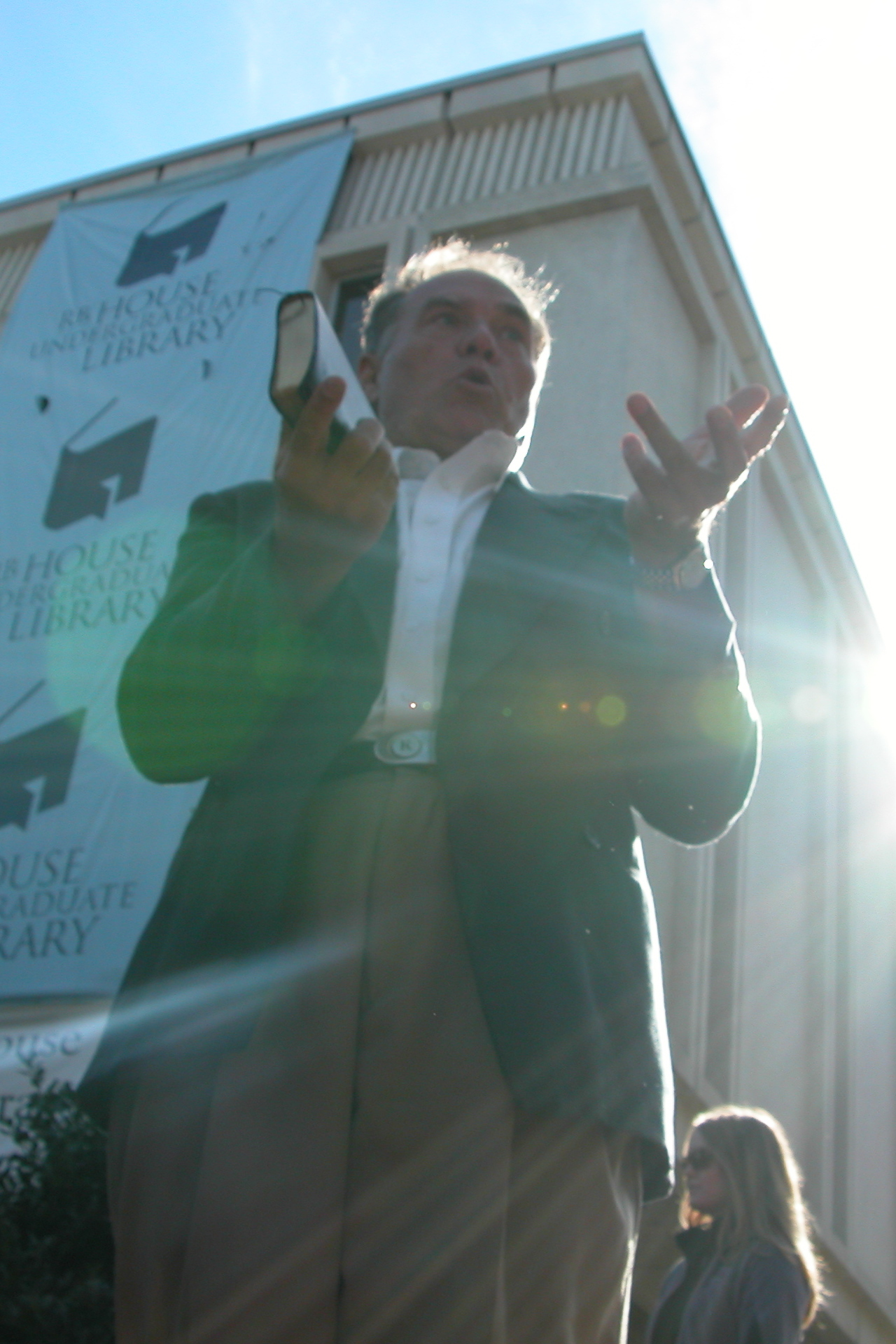
- Birdsong preaching at UNC
- Born: May 22, 1943
- Died: February 27, 2025 (aged 81)
- Other name: Preacher Gary
- Occupation: Preacher
- Known for: Fundamentalist Christian preaching

Gary Eugene Birdsong (May 22, 1943 – February 27, 2025), commonly known as Preacher Gary or The Pit Preacher, was a travelling fundamentalist Christian preacher who frequented college campuses across the United States, particularly in North Carolina. He was known for his unorthodox interpretation of the Bible and his theatrical, accusatory style of preaching. He often argued vehemently with other, more moderate Christians who accused him of misrepresenting the Christian faith and driving people away from it with his extremism.

Birdsong, known to his audience as the Fear God Preacher (at North Carolina State University), New Quad Preacher (at the University of North Carolina at Charlotte), the Pit Preacher (at the University of North Carolina at Chapel Hill), the Sanford Mall Preacher (at Appalachian State University), and the Joyner Steps Preacher (at East Carolina University) had a large repertoire of subjects on which he preached, ranging from the standards of heaven and hell, to drug use, premarital sex, homosexuality, Islam, atheism, feminism, communism, masturbation, rock and rap music, abortion, evolution, tolerance, politics, war, fashion, witchcraft, racism, and demonic possession.

== Preaching style and repertoire ==
Birdsong used a theatrical, accusatory style of preaching because he believed "getting people angry is his most effective method of preaching". He often offended students with his fundamentalist views, such as his belief that "white folks are different, black folks are different and when you start mixing them up there's a lot of confusion", and his opinion on feminism was that "it ain't in the Bible". His views frequently resulted in heated debates with students, though he said it was not until "folks get attitudes that I get attitude".

When asked by a student interviewer his opinion on UNC being a liberal university, he responded, "This University is the most stupidest place I have ever been." He called the administration "wicked people", and said, "they've perverted the First Amendment — the state was told not to interfere with the First Amendment, the freedom to practice religion. Well, just look at what religion they're talking about! It's Christianity — look at the founding fathers!" His nickname for the university is "Homo Hill", his view on homosexuality being that it is "an abomination to God".

== Student reactions ==
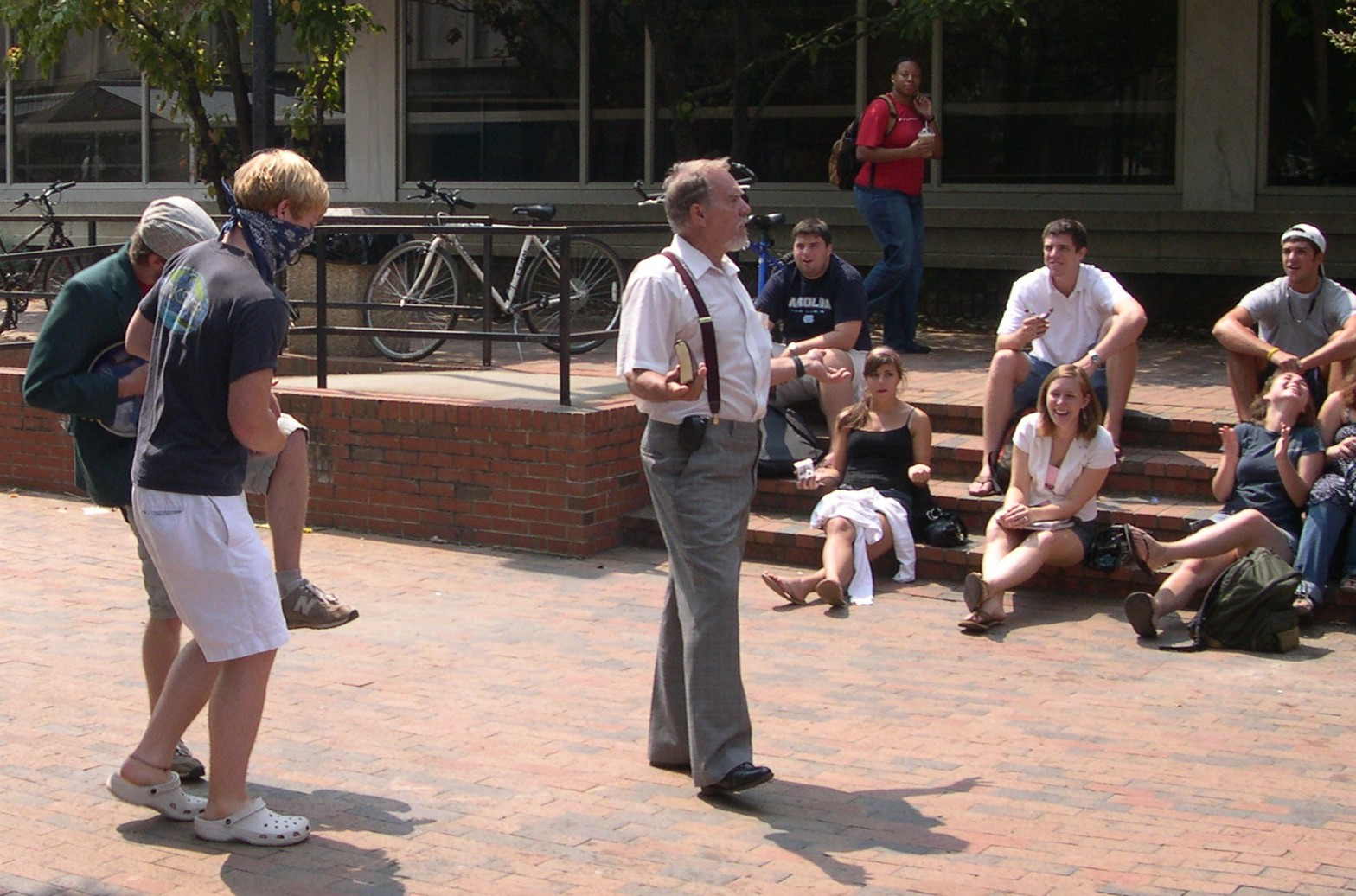
UNC-Chapel Hill students providing a musical ambush of Birdsong

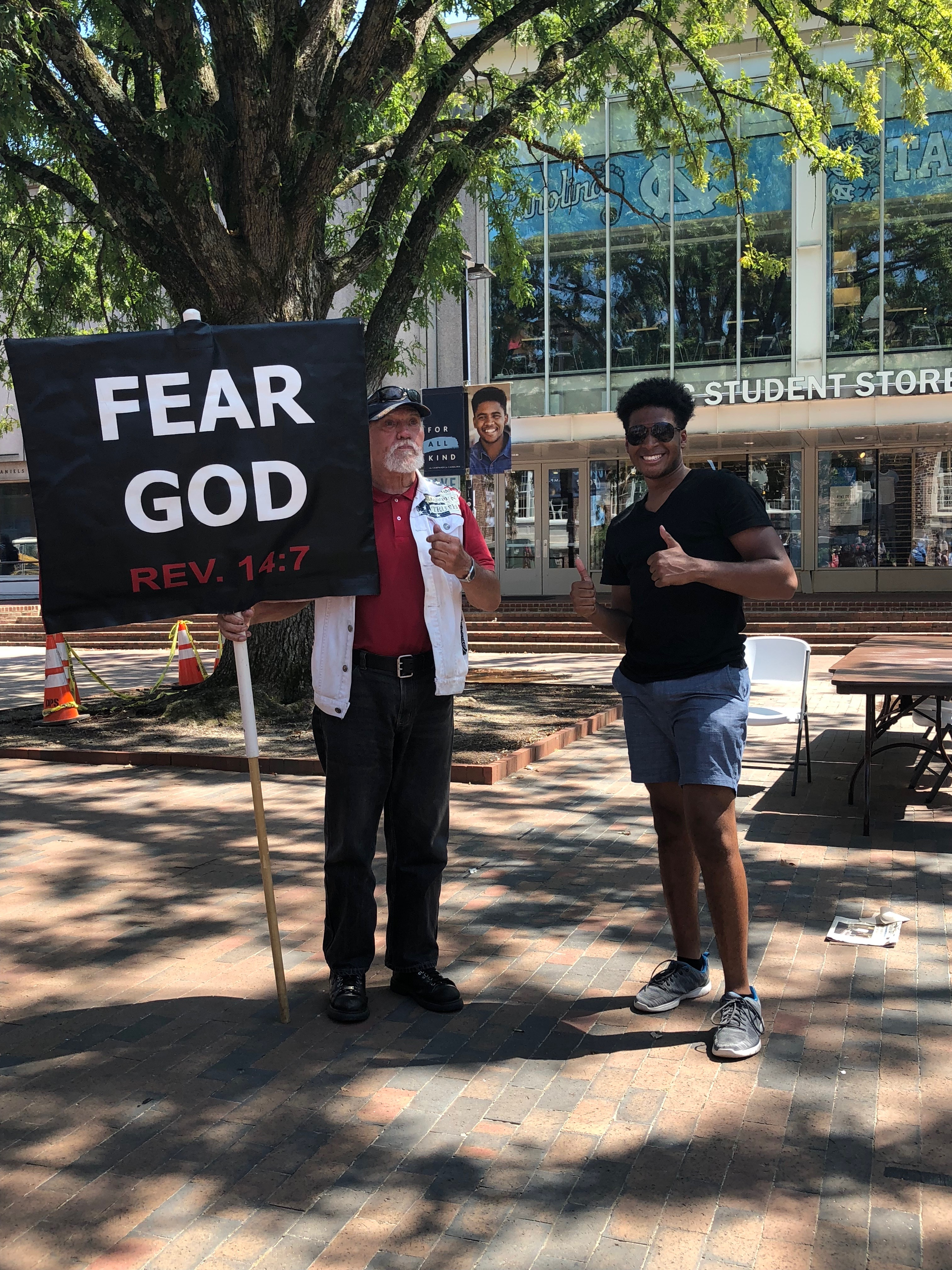
Birdsong standing next to a student in the Pit in 2018

On March 8, 2007, Birdsong was removed from The Pit by Campus Police following an incident. According to reports, members of the UNC outdoor recreation program Carolina Adventures had reserved half of The Pit to promote their programs. Shortly after they set up their materials, Birdsong entered The Pit near their table and began to preach. They asked him to move away from their table, and Birdsong moved to the other side of The Pit. The representatives for Carolina Adventures did not feel this was sufficient and asked UNC Police to remove Birdsong from the area. After refusing to move farther away, he was removed to loud jeers directed at the police from the crowd that had gathered to watch him preach. A similar incident occurred in the 1980s resulting in his arrest.

Birdsong was issued a trespass warning that prohibited him from entering The Pit for two years. Following the incident, he returned to preach, initially in front of Davis Library, about 100 feet from The Pit, and later about 200 feet away, in front of Wilson Library on Polk Place, which he referred to as "the Homo Zone". During this dislocation, he was sometimes referred to as the "adjacent to the Pit preacher". In March 2009, Birdsong's two-year banishment from The Pit expired and he once again returned to preach in The Pit. Some students were glad to see him return to this popular spot after his extended absence, but the overall reaction was mixed. Some disagreed with his beliefs but felt he had a right to be there. Others just found him entertaining.

== Backstory ==
Birdsong professed to be an ex-Hells Angel, citing that fact multiple times when he was preaching about forgiveness. He claimed that his "calling" came to him in the middle of 40 Hells Angels in Durham County, North Carolina.

== Death ==
Gary Birdsong died on February 27, 2025.

== See also ==
- List of campus preachers
- Chapel Hill Campus
