= Camisole =

Women's undershirt

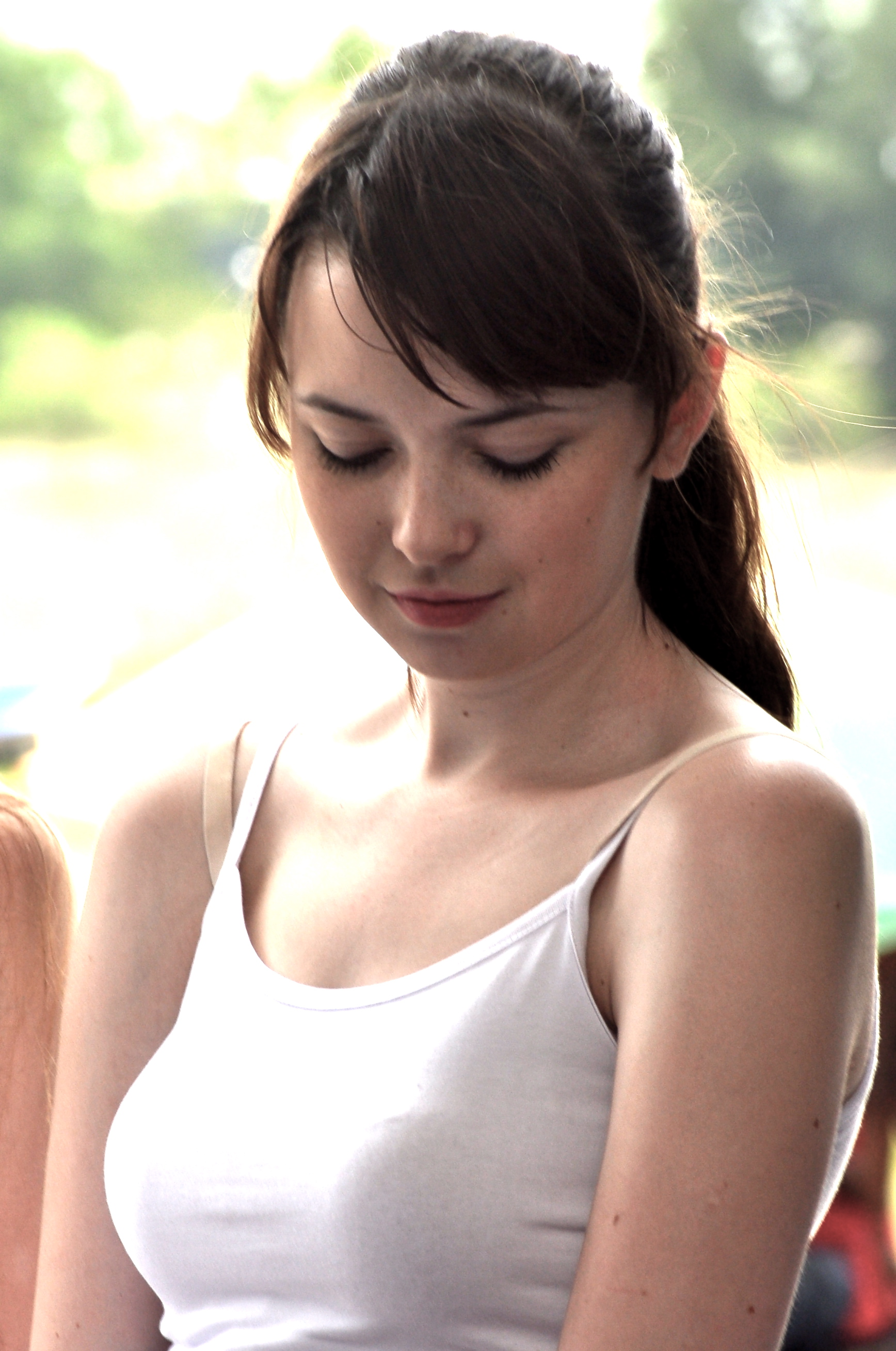
A woman in a white camisole. Lycra led to closer fitting camisoles in the late 2000s and the 2010s.

A camisole is a sleeveless undershirt typically worn by women, extending to the waist. The camisole is usually made of satin, nylon, silk, or cotton.

== Historical definition ==
Historically, camisole referred to jackets of various kinds, including overshirts (worn under a doublet or bodice), women's négligées, and sleeved jackets worn by men.

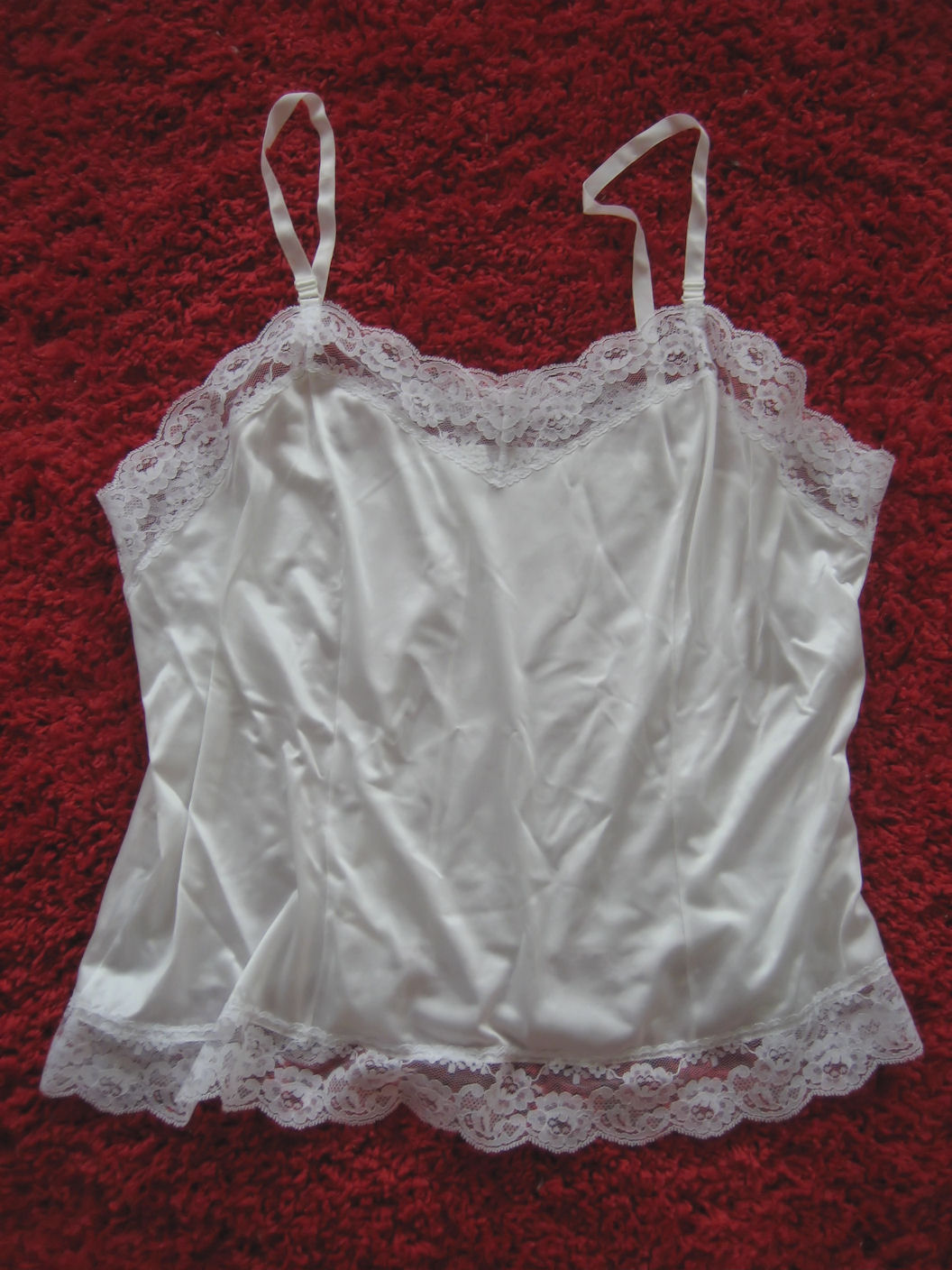
A late 20th century camisole

== Modern usage ==
In modern usage, a camisole or cami is a loose-fitting sleeveless undershirt that covers the top part of the body but is shorter than a chemise. A camisole normally extends to the waist but is sometimes cropped to expose the midriff, or extended to cover the entire pelvic region. Camisoles are manufactured from light materials, commonly cotton-based, occasionally satin or silk, or stretch fabrics such as lycra, nylon, or spandex.

A camisole typically has thin "spaghetti straps" and can be worn over a brassiere or without one. Since 1989, some camisoles have come with a built-in underwire bra or other support that eliminates the need for a bra among those who prefer not to wear one. Starting around the 2000s, camisoles have been known to be used as outerwear.

A variety of sleeveless body shaping undergarments have been derived from the camisole shape, offering medium control of the bust, waist, or abdomen. Such control camisoles are the most casual of shaping garments, covering the torso from above the chest to at or below the waist. They look similar to tight-fitting cotton or silk camisoles, but the straps are usually wider, the hems longer, and the stretchy, shiny fabric provides a smoothing touch.

== See also ==
- Sleeveless shirt
- Slip dress, another item of women's underwear that has become outerwear
- Teddy (garment)
- Undershirt

== Sources ==
- Barbier, Muriel & Boucher, Shazia (2003). The Story of Lingerie. Parkstone. ISBN 1-85995-804-4
- Saint-Laurent, Cecil (1986). The Great Book of Lingerie. Academy editions. ISBN 0-85670-901-8
