= Undershirt =

Underwear for the upper body

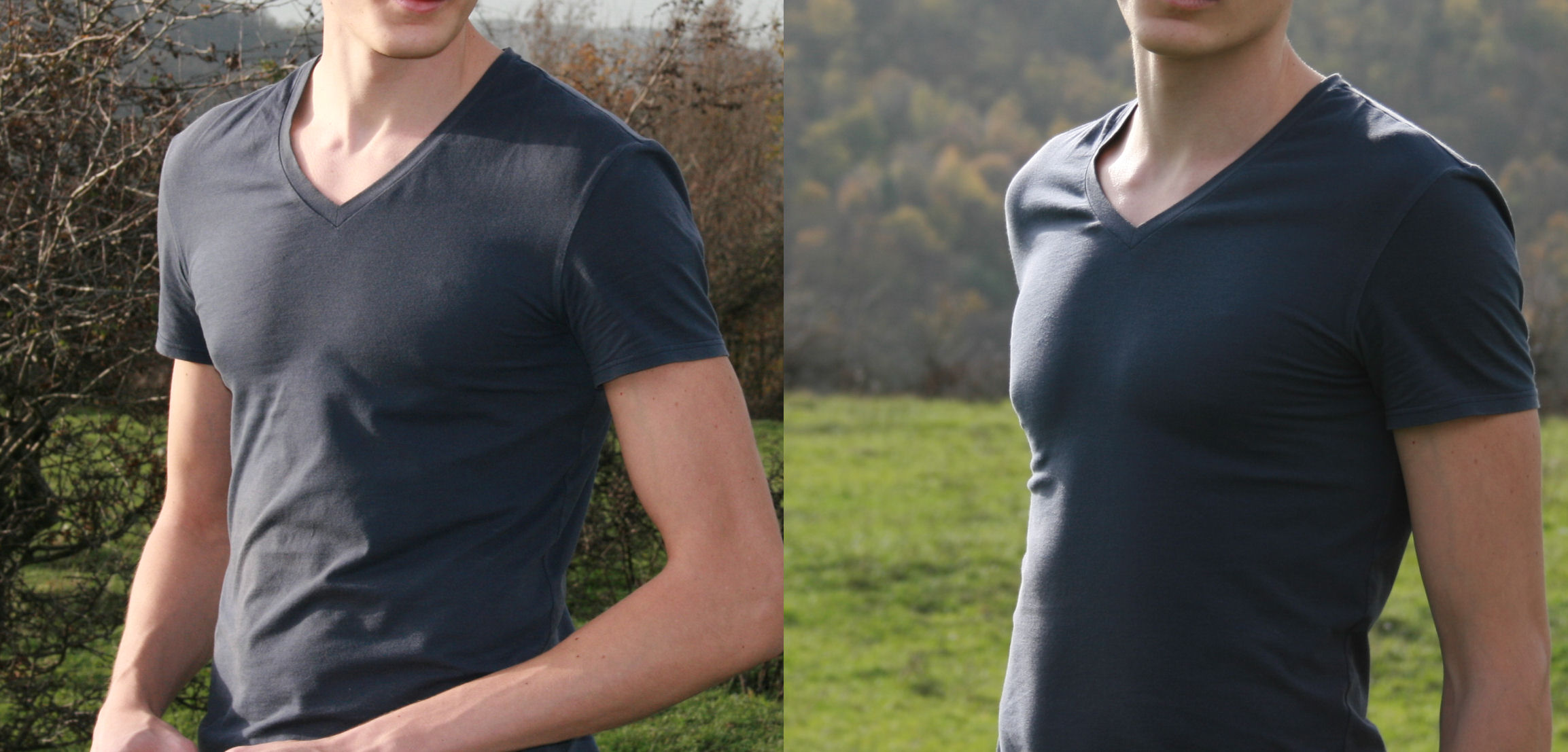
Example of a T-shirt to be worn as an undershirt and usually not as outerwear

An undershirt in American English, vest in British and South African English, baniyan in the Indian subcontinent, or singlet in Australia and New Zealand, is an article of underwear worn underneath a shirt for warmth or to protect it from body sweat and odors. It can have short sleeves (T-shirt) or be sleeveless (A-shirt).

An undershirt may be worn to protect the body from stiff or otherwise uncomfortable fabric. It also makes dress shirts less transparent, and absorbs sweat that would otherwise wet the shirt's fabric. It can be worn during winter months as an extra layer of warmth, and reduces wear on the upper layers of clothing.

== History ==
Factory mass-produced undershirts became common in the West in the early 20th century, with innovations turning the union suit into two pieces, for upper and lower body.

== Types of undershirt ==
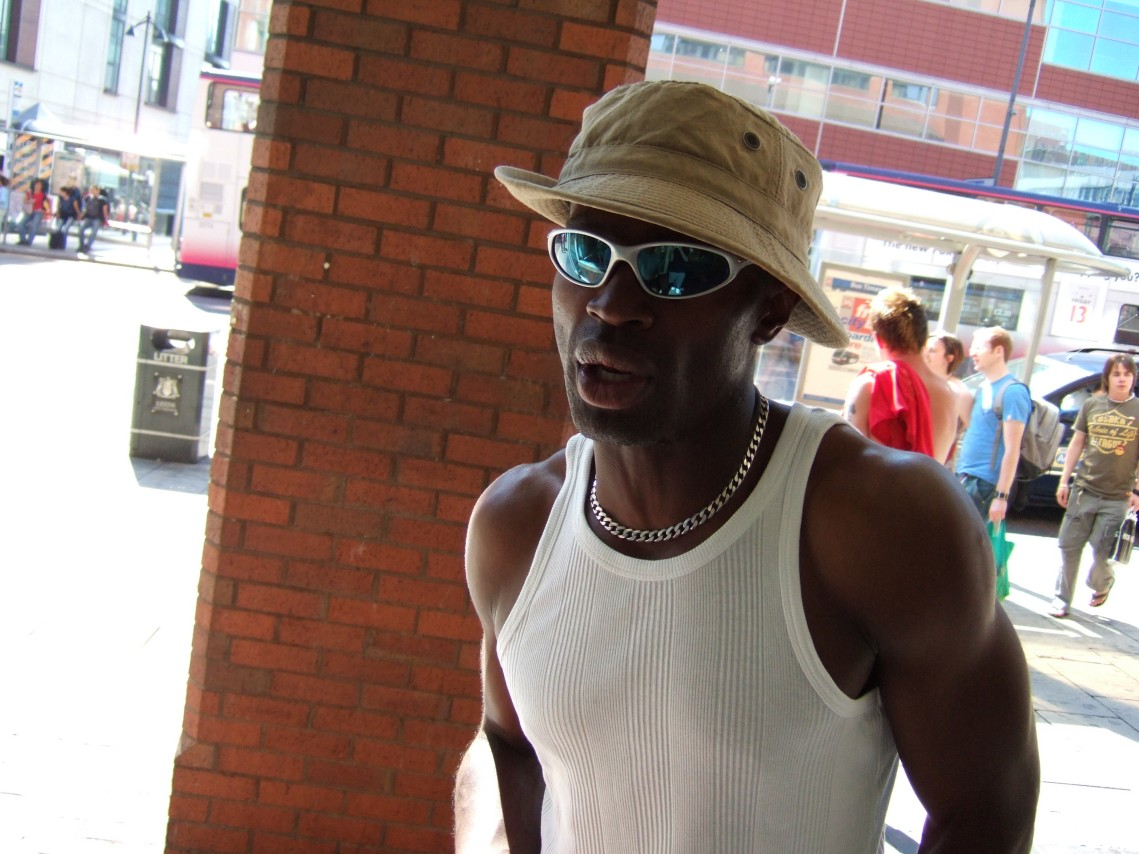
An A-shirt

- A sleeveless undershirt, also known as an A-shirt, tank top, has large armholes, a large neck hole, and offers little protection for armpit sweat.
- A crew neck T-shirt has a high neckline, often requiring fully buttoned shirts to avoid being seen.
- A V-neck T-shirt has a V-shaped neckline. This allows the wearer to unbutton the upper buttons of a collared shirt without the undershirt being seen.
- A long sleeved T-shirt has long sleeves, and may be designed with extra insulation for use in cool weather.
- A camisole is an undershirt for women.
- A string vest is an undergarment made of mesh fabric that traps pockets of still air to act as thermal insulation.
