= Open-air preaching =

Public proselytization of a religious message to crowds of people in open places

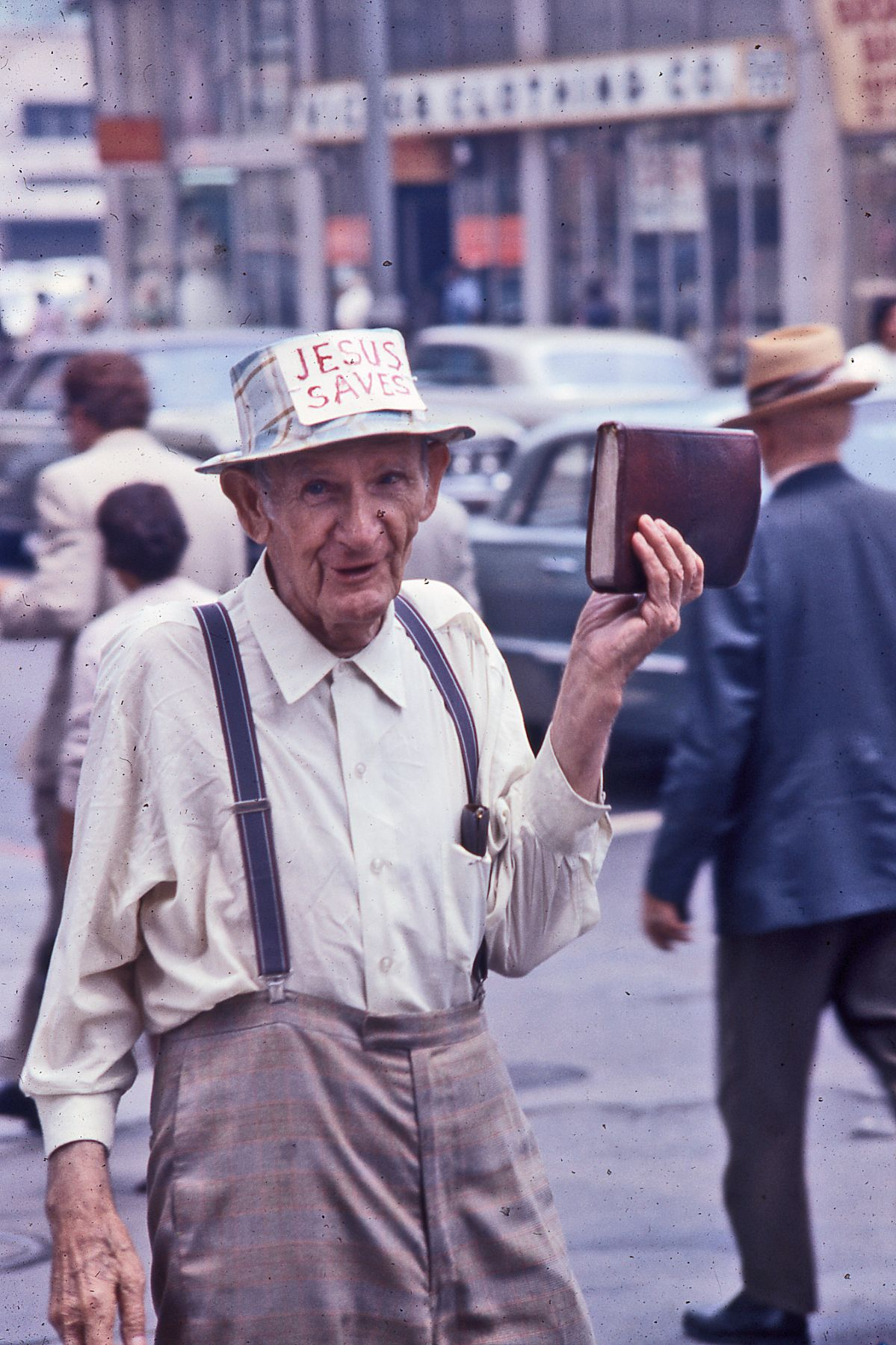
Street preacher in Los Angeles, California, 1972

Open-air preaching, street preaching, or public preaching is the act of evangelizing a religious faith in public places. It is an ancient method of proselytizing a religious or social message and has been used by many cultures and religious traditions, but today it is usually associated with evangelical Protestant Christianity. Supporters of this approach note that Jesus and many of the Old Testament prophets often preached about God in public places. It is one of the oldest approaches to evangelism.

== In the Bible ==
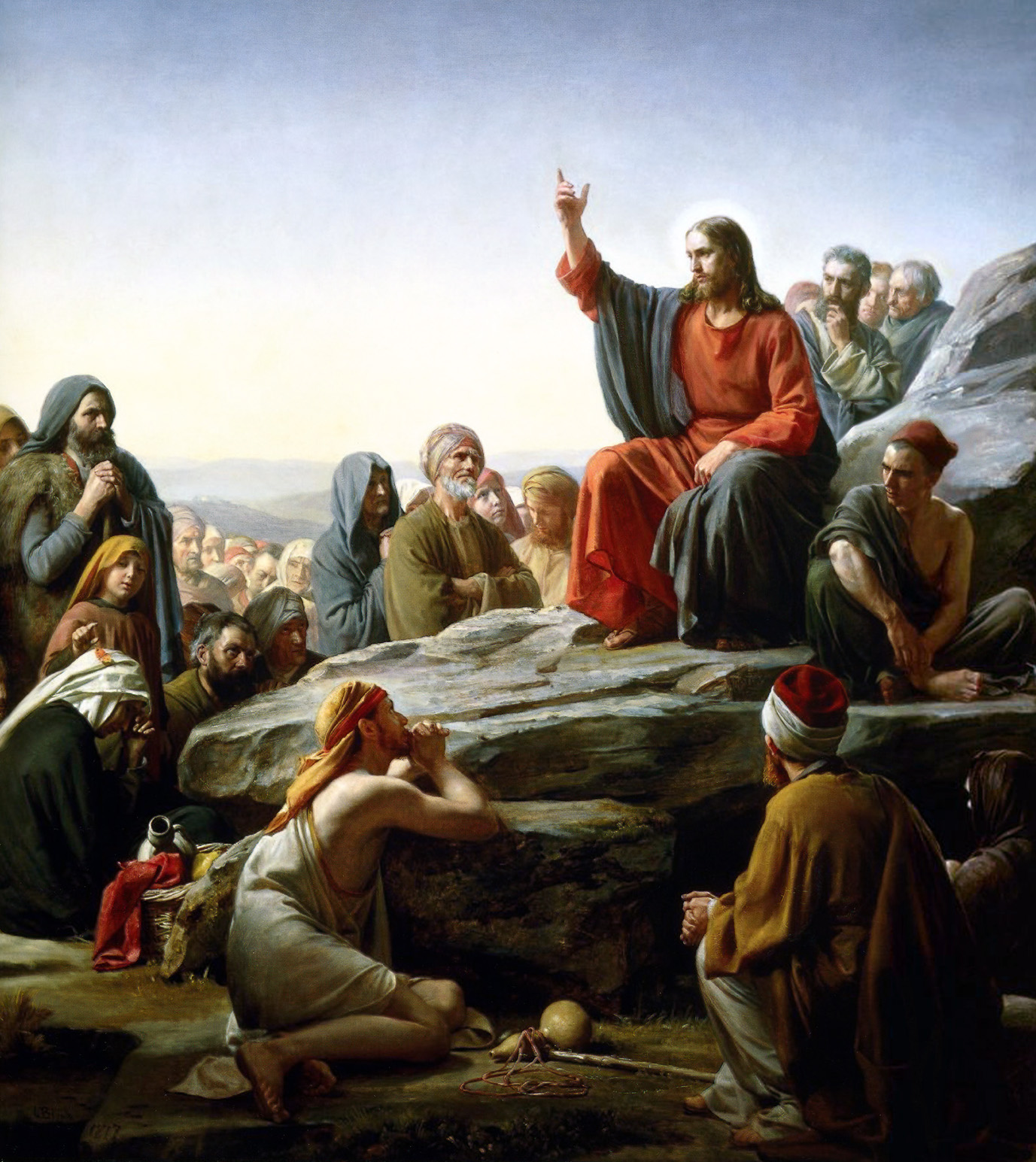
A representative painting of Jesus Christ delivering the open-air Sermon on the Mount

One of the earliest open-air preachers of Christianity, according to the gospels, was Jesus Christ, whose first specifically recorded sermon was the Sermon on the Mount, which took place on a mountainside in the open air. In the Gospel of Luke (Luke 6:17–49), it was recorded that Jesus also gave an open-air sermon known as the Sermon on the Plain. In Mark 16:15, street preaching is seen as a commandment from Jesus as a way to warn people about sins and their consequences. This is supported by Isaiah 58:1 and Jeremiah 2:2.

After Jesus' death and resurrection, many of his apostles and followers started street preaching the gospel in the Temple of Jerusalem and in other open spaces.

The Christian Apologetics and Research Ministry lists the "many examples of street preaching in the Bible" as including Noah, Solomon, Ezra, Jeremiah, Jonah, John the Baptist, Jesus Christ, Peter, Paul, Phillip and Apollos.

== Middle Ages and Reformation ==
Open-air preaching was used by mendicant orders in the High Middle Ages to initiate a renewal of religious fervor among Catholics, and to fight heretical movements such as Catharism in southern France. Later, during the Protestant Reformation, it was often employed by Protestants throughout Europe who could not always preach inside churches, which were mostly Catholic. Open-air preaching in Europe continued during the rise of Puritanism and other Protestant movements. It was often used in Pastoral environments as well as in cities, the former sometimes due to a desire to avoid the authorities, and the latter because, for one reason, it could reach eccentric people living in cities who would not otherwise hear the gospel.

== Evangelical Revivals ==
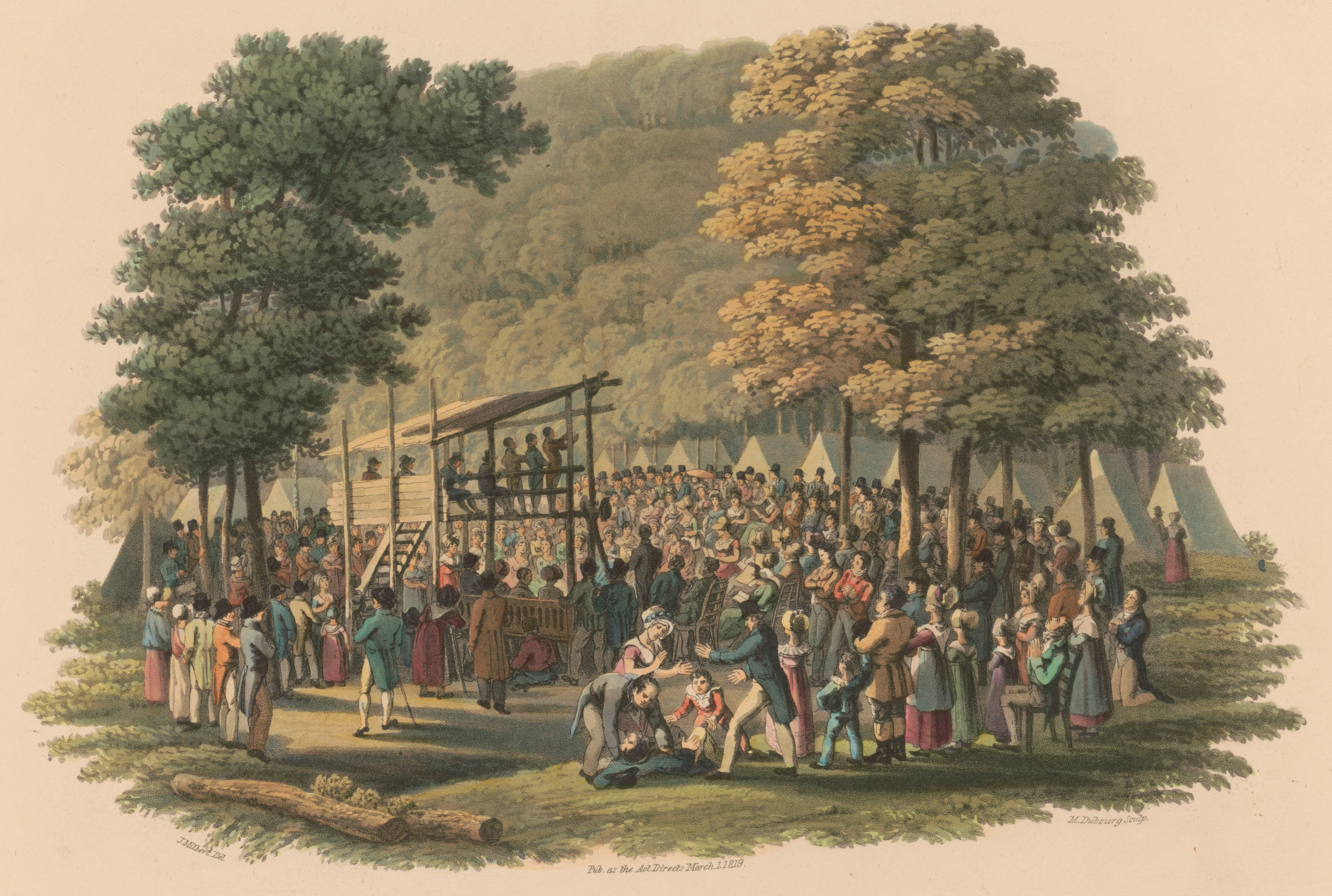
Methodist preachers were known for promulgating the doctrines of the new birth and entire sanctification to the public at events such as tent revivals and camp meetings, which they believe is the reason that God raised them up into existence.

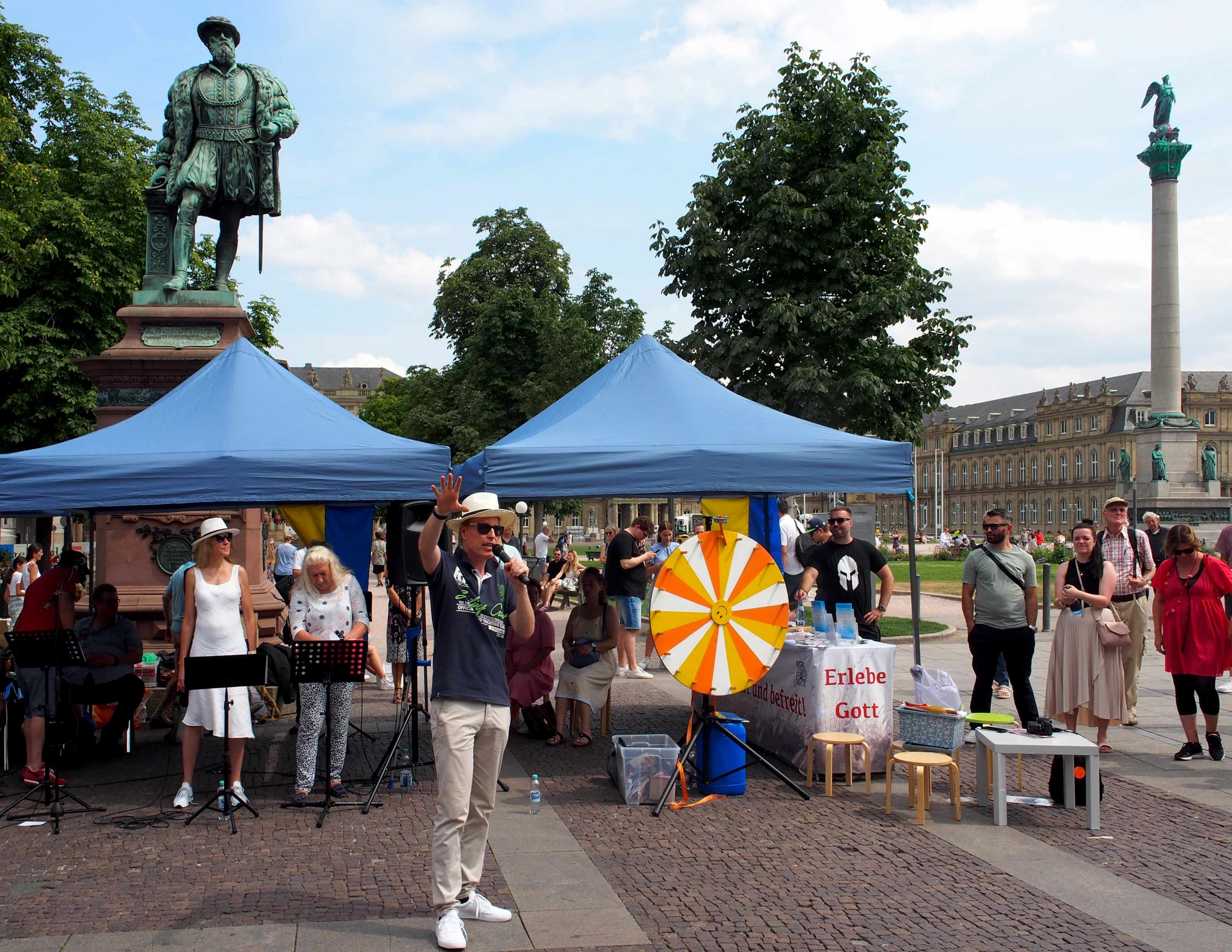
A street preacher in Germany, 2022

Early Methodist preachers John Wesley and George Whitefield preached in the open air, which allowed them to attract crowds larger than most buildings could accommodate. On one occasion when Wesley was forbidden to preach inside the church in his hometown, Epworth, he used his father's tombstone in the churchyard as a pulpit.

Open-air preachers throughout history have often noted that preaching to large crowds often causes preachers to be abused in certain ways, even having objects thrown at them such as rotting vegetables or unsanitary liquids of many varieties. It was said that one of the regular practices of American evangelist Dwight L. Moody in the late 1860s "was to exhort the passersby in the evenings from the steps of the court house. Often these impromptu gatherings drew as many hecklers as supporters."

In the late 19th century and early-to-mid 20th century many famous open-air preachers in the United States began to preach, such as Billy Graham and Billy Sunday. Graham in particular used a combination of open-air preaching and the recent advent of televangelism to broadcast his sermons, which often took place in large venues such as stadiums, to large portions of the world and millions of Americans.

Charles Spurgeon, the famous open-air Baptist preacher of England, believed that open-air preaching was instrumental in getting people to hear the gospel who might otherwise never hear it, and today, open-air preachers such as Ray Comfort believe that it reaches many more people at once than other approaches to evangelism do.

== Notable open-air preachers ==
=== Historic ===
- Saint John the Baptist
- Saint Dominic
- Saint Francis of Assisi
- Saint Anthony of Padua
- Saint Vincent Ferrer
- William Booth
- D. L. Moody
- Charles Spurgeon
- John Wesley
- George Whitefield
- George Wishart

=== Active in the 21st century ===
- Arnol Kox
- Micah Armstrong
- Jed Smock
- Ray Comfort
- Samuel Chambers (State Street Preacher)
- Reinhard Bonnke
- David Grisham

== Bibliography ==
- Charles Haddon Spurgeon, "Lectures to My Students", Zondervan publishing house, 1977, Eighth printing, ISBN 0-310-32910-8
