= Brother Jim =

American preacher

James Gilles (born 1962), better known as Jim Gilles or more commonly Brother Jim, was an American evangelist whose ministry was concentrated on college campuses and outdoor events. He preached on over 335 college and University campuses in 49 states and 6 countries.

== Lawsuits and rallies ==
Jim Gilles reported a conversion experience at a Van Halen concert in Evansville, Indiana on November 7, 1980. His ministry focused on condemning what he viewed as sinful behaviors, and his oppositional style created conflict with students and faculty.

Gilles has engaged in several civil rights lawsuits challenging university and city attempts to stop or limit his preaching.

In August 2016, Gilles attended the 2016 GOP convention.
