= Chemise =

Loose-fitting shirt-like underwear for women

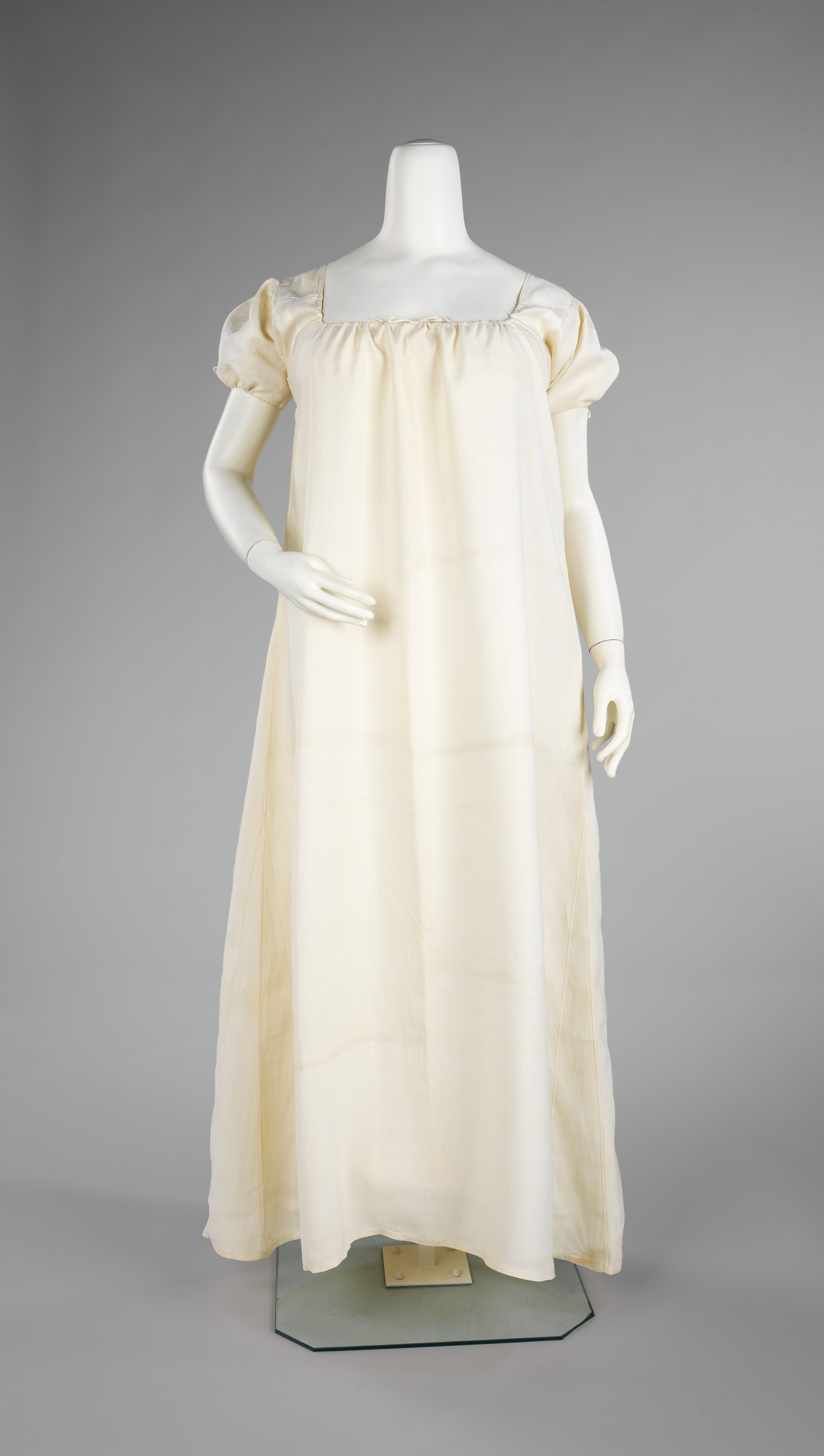
Chemise, linen, c.1790–1810. The Metropolitan Museum of Art Costume Institute: 2009.300.392.

A chemise, meaning shirt in French, or shift is a classic smock type of women's undergarment or dress. Historically, a chemise was a simple garment worn over the skin to protect clothing from sweat and body oils, the precursor to the modern shirts commonly worn in Western nations. A chemise is usually longer than a peignoir, but remarkably shorter than the babydoll.

== Etymology ==
The English word chemise is a loanword from the French word for shirt and is related to the Italian camicia or Latin camisia, which, according to Elizabeth Wayland Barber, is likely derived from Celtic.

== History ==
The chemise seems to have developed from the Roman tunica and first became popular in Europe in the Middle Ages. At this time, the chemise was commonly referred to as a kemse or kemes. A type of undergarment worn close to the skin in order to protect outergarments, though the term chemise has since been commonly considered a women’s garment, during this period (Medieval through to the 15th century), it was also used to describe an item of men’s underclothing. Women wore a shift or chemise under their gown or robe; while men wore a chemise with their trousers or braies, and covered the chemise with garments such as doublets, robes, etc.

A chemise, shift, or smock was usually sewn at home, by the women of a household. It was assembled from rectangles and triangles cut from one piece of cloth so as to leave no waste. The poor would wear chemises pieced from a narrow piece of rough cloth; while the rich might have voluminous chemises pieced from thin, smooth fine linen.

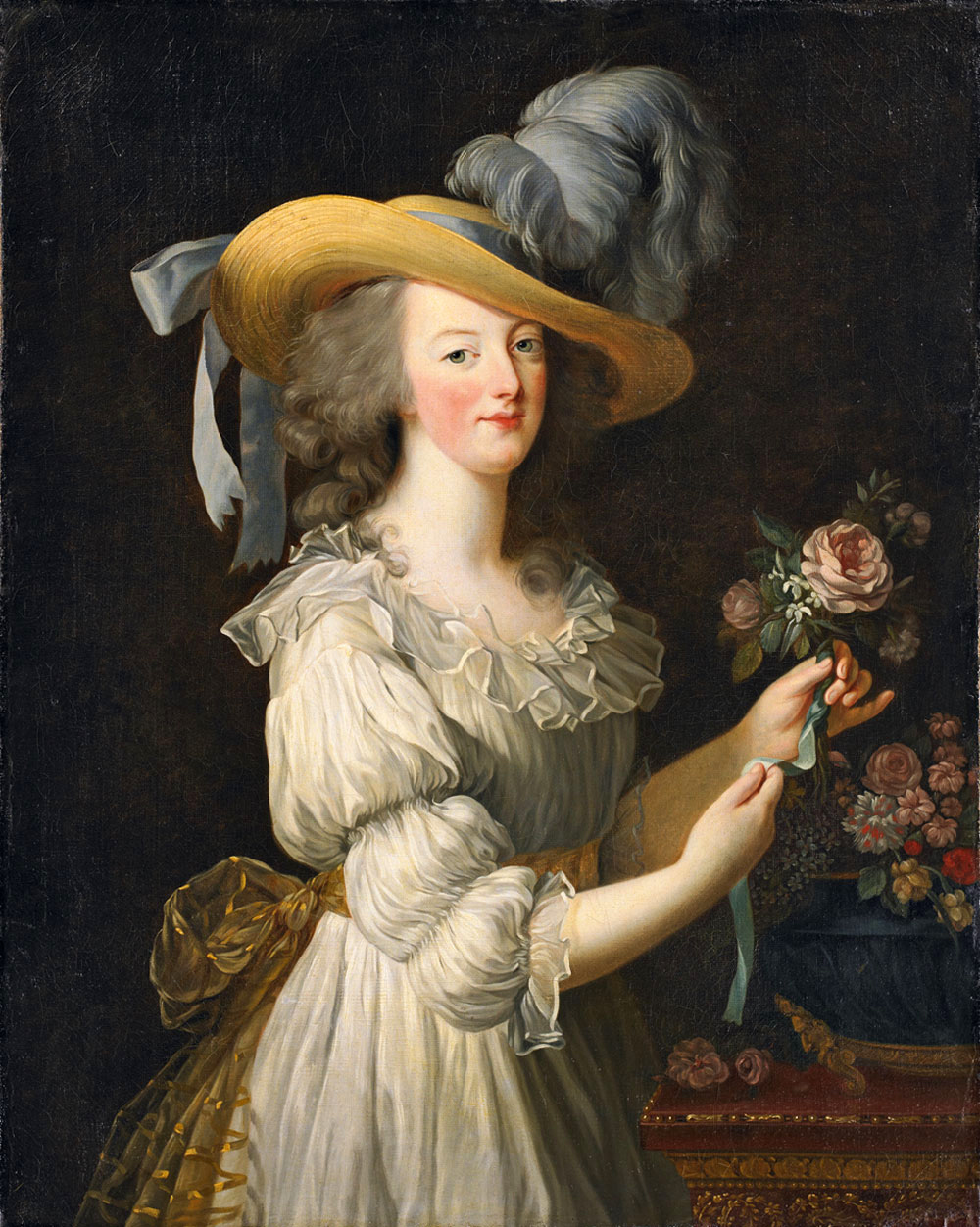
Marie Antoinette wearing a dress that came to be known as chemise à la reine

Chemises during the period up to the 15th century were most often made from linen. Over time cotton chemise also came into popularity, as both linen and cotton were easy to wash – underclothes often being the only piece of clothing that was washed regularly. Because the chemise, shift, or smock protected the outer clothes from the skin and could be washed regularly, even the peasantry often had multiple; the wealthy had dozens. Through the 17th and 18th centuries, linen was considered an essential means of maintaining cleanliness and health; therefore, a starched white chemise served as an indicator of an individual’s personal hygiene.

The term chemise was first used to describe an outer garment in the 1780s, when Queen Marie Antoinette of France popularized a kind of informal, loose-fitting gown of sheer white cotton, resembling a chemise in both cut and material, which became known as the chemise à la reine. Such a chemise gown was made from very lightweight, slightly sheer fabrics, including muslin, silk, or cambric.

Nevertheless, through the 18th century, the term chemise continued to be used to refer primarily to an undergarment, of the type earlier described as a smock for women, or a shirt for men. Through the century, the term shift slowly replaced smock, which would eventually be exchanged for chemise in the 19th century, as the term chemise was deemed more socially acceptable than shift, which had developed connotations of crudeness.

Into the 19th century, the chemise as an undergarment developed structure, fitting to the bust where worn next to the skin, underneath a pair of stays, the shaping and fabrics used reminiscent of late 18th century chemise. Though simple in design, the early 19th century chemise often featured small decorative elements, such as a lace or ruffled edge.

Where early and mid-19th-century examples are often of plain cotton with a square-cut neckline, through the century, chemise as an undergarment developed different shapes and styles, some being highly decorative with trimmings and embroidery. Through the century, different types of undergarments began to be worn, including combinations.

In Western countries, the chemise as an undergarment fell out of fashion in the early 20th century, and was generally replaced by a brassiere, girdle, and full slip, and panties first came to be worn.

Men's chemises may be said to have survived as the common T-shirt, which still serves as an undergarment. The chemise also morphed into the smock-frock, a garment worn by English laborers until the early 20th century. Its loose cut and wide sleeves were well adapted to heavy labor. The name smock is still used for military combat jackets in the UK.

== Modern chemise ==
A modern chemise is generally a woman's garment that vaguely resembles the older shirts but is typically more delicate, and usually more revealing. Most commonly the term refers to a loose-fitting, sleeveless undergarment or type of lingerie which is unfitted at the waist. It can also refer to a short, sleeveless dress that hangs straight from the shoulders and fits loosely at the waist. A chemise typically does not have any buttons or other fasteners and is put on by either dropping it over the head or stepping into it and lifting it up.

As lingerie, a chemise is similar to a babydoll, which is also a short, loose-fitting, sleeveless garment. Typically, though, babydolls are looser fitting at the hips.

== Gallery ==
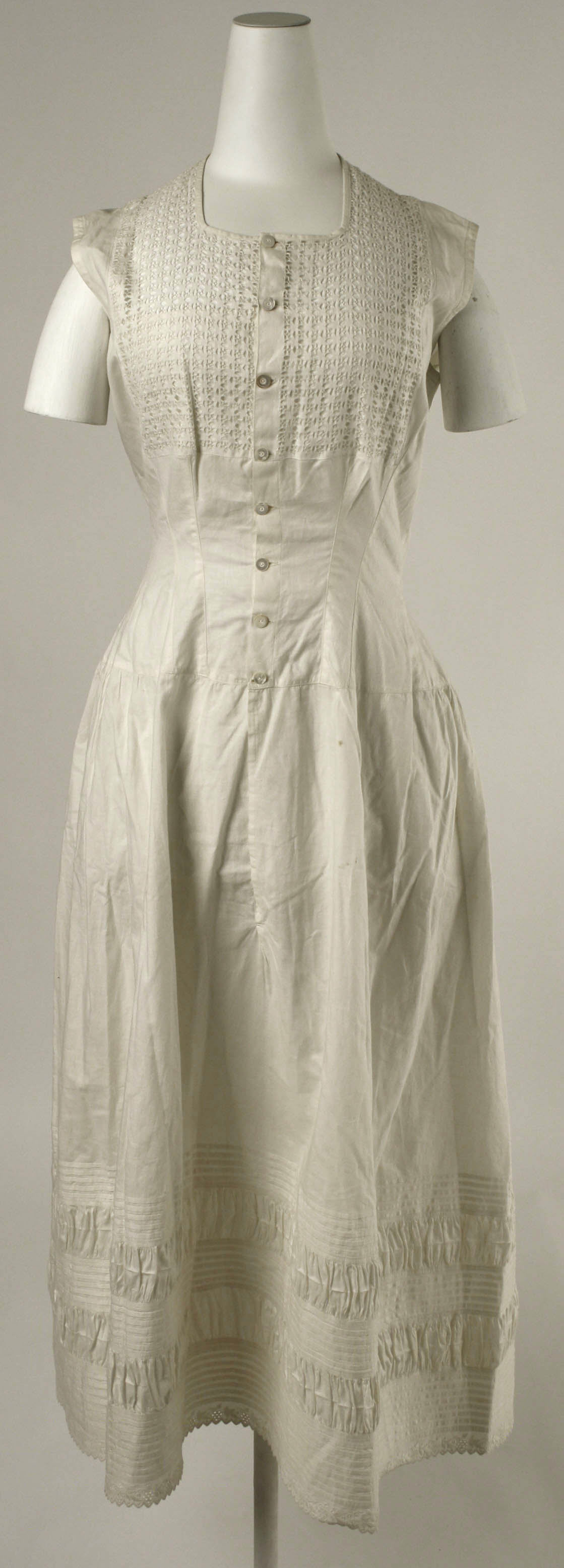
Chemise, cotton, probably American, c.1880s. The Metropolitan Museum of Art Costume Institute

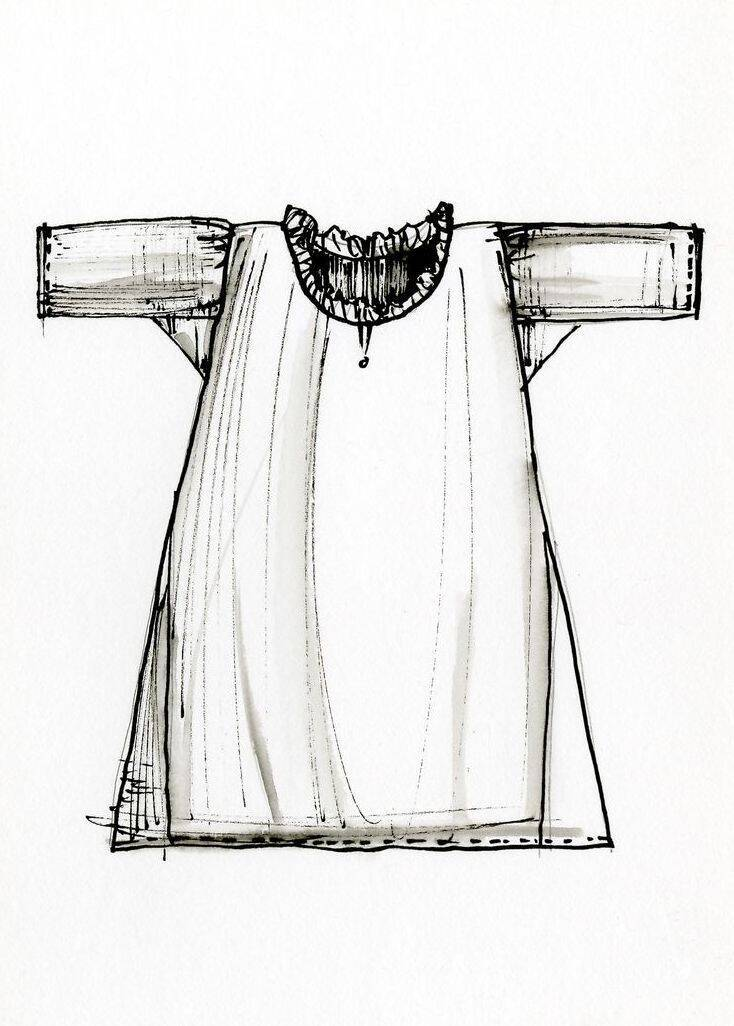
A drawing of a chemise, laid flat (2014)

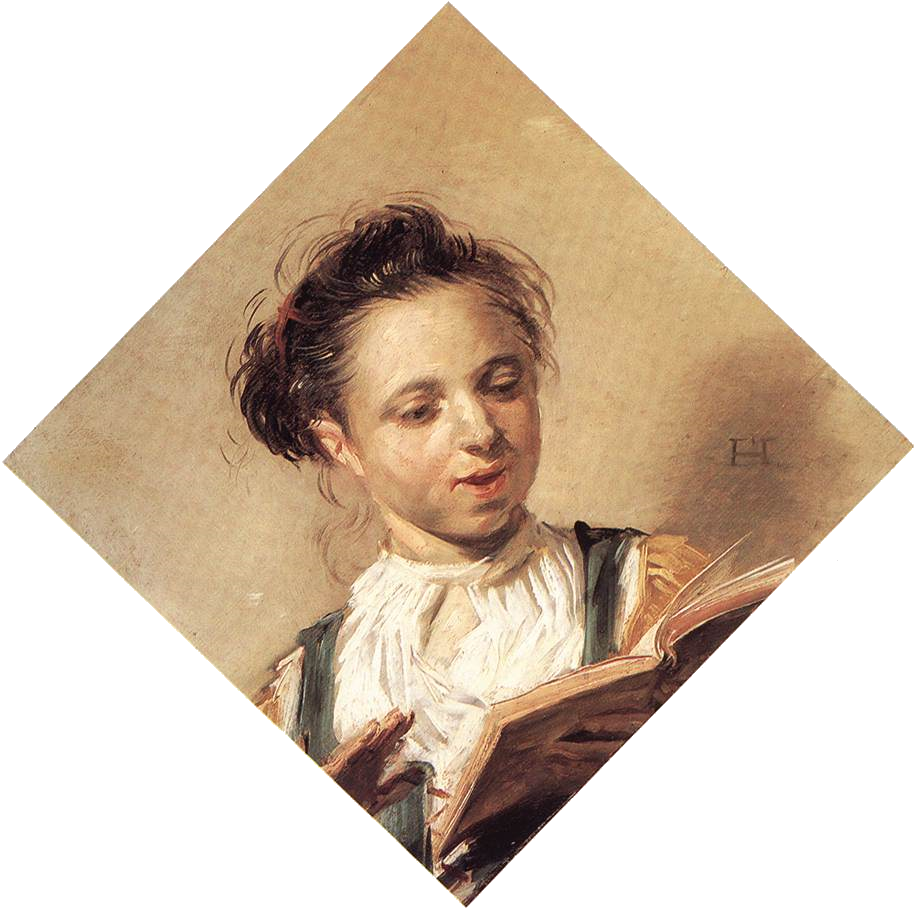
17th-century Holland: Linen chemise beneath a young woman's everyday domestic bodice. Girl Singing, by Frans Hals.

== See also ==
- Shift dress
- Camisole
- Kirtle
- Shalwar kameez
- Slip (clothing)
- Smock (disambiguation)
- Teddy (garment)

== Bibliography ==
- Burnham, Dorothy (1973). Cut My Cote. Royal Ontario Museum. ISBN 978-0-88854-046-1.. A survey of shirt patterns over the ages, with diagrams.
- Smith, Kathleen R. (February–March 1987). "A Plain Linen Shift: Plain Sewing Makes the Most of Your Fabric". Threads Magazine.
