= Brother Jed =

American evangelist (1943–2022)

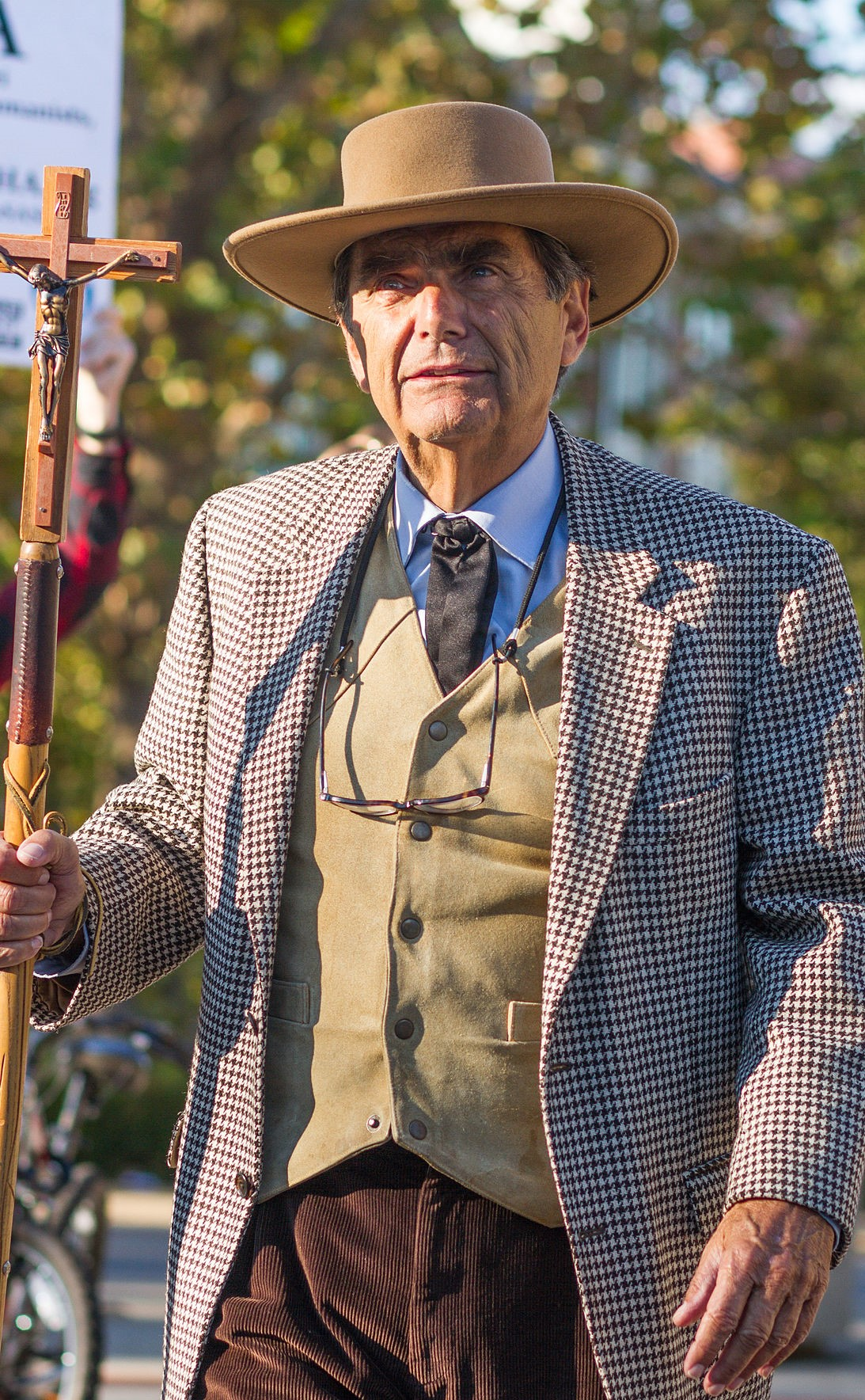
- Brother Jed in 2014
- Born: George Edward Smock Jr. January 4, 1943; Brookings, South Dakota, U.S.
- Died: June 6, 2022 (aged 79)
- Occupation: Campus evangelist
- Years active: 1972–2022
- Spouse: Cynthia D. Lasseter (m. 1983)
- Children: 5

Ecclesiastical career
- Religion: Fundamentalist Christianity and Pelagianism
- Writings: Who Will Rise Up?: A Call to Confrontational Evangelism (1984); Gold in the Furnace: South Africa on Trial (1987); Grieve Not the Spirit (1992); Walking in the Spirit (1992); The Mystery of Christ Revealed: The Key to Understanding Predestination (2000)
- Website: www.brojed.org

George Edward "Jed" Smock Jr. (January 4, 1943 – June 6, 2022), better known as Brother Jed, was an American evangelist whose open-air preaching ministry was concentrated on college campuses. He preached at major universities in all 50 US states and other countries. As an itinerant preacher, he usually spent only a few days on each campus, visiting the northern campuses in the fall and spring and the southern campuses in the winter. In 2004, he relocated to Columbia, Missouri, where he often preached at the University of Missouri and other colleges throughout the Midwest. In the summer of 2013, he relocated his ministry and residence to his hometown of Terre Haute, Indiana.

== Biography ==
Brother Jed's self-described lifestyle of "drunkenness, dissipation, and debauchery" began while he was a freshman in high school. Older friends exposed him to alcohol, which became a regular part of his life. Smock began attending Indiana University in 1960. By his second year, he had established himself as the heaviest drinker in the fraternity. Smock would soon drop out of Indiana University and hitchhike to California, where he was a door-to-door encyclopedia salesman.

Smock would later go on to finish his undergraduate education at Indiana State University, continuing his previous lifestyle of "debauchery." There, he graduated with honors, majoring in social studies with a minor in English. Smock states in his autobiography that, despite his lifestyle, he graduated near the top of his class, going straight to the bars after taking his last senior final exam. He was hospitalized after being punched while trying to stop a fight, leaving him with a scar on his face. Smock claims to have woken up in an emergency room with no recollection of the night before, having details being filled in by his friend, and having gone back out to the bars that same night.

Smock attended graduate school at Indiana State University, earning a master's degree in history and wrote a thesis on "the personal effects of smoking seven straight joints of marijuana" while he was a research assistant in psychology for the Institute of Research into Human Behavior at the school. Smock served as a history professor for one year at the University of Wisconsin–La Crosse.

He converted to Christianity after being preached to by an Arab carrying a cross in Morocco.

Smock formed Campus Ministry USA, a para-church organization, in 1984. In 2004, the group moved its operations from Newark, Ohio, to Columbia, Missouri, where he often preached at the University of Missouri on Speakers Circle.

Brother Jed left Columbia for Indiana in 2013. His family was documented for a pilot TV series while preaching in Indiana.

Brother Jed frequented Eastern Illinois University and Southern Illinois University. He frequently claimed to have "found the Lord in a Burger King, home of the Whopper!"

== Personal life ==
Jed married Cynthia D. Lasseter Smock (who calls herself “Sister Cindy” when preaching). They have five daughters, all of whom have accompanied them on their travels and appearances on college campuses.

== Preaching style and personal views ==
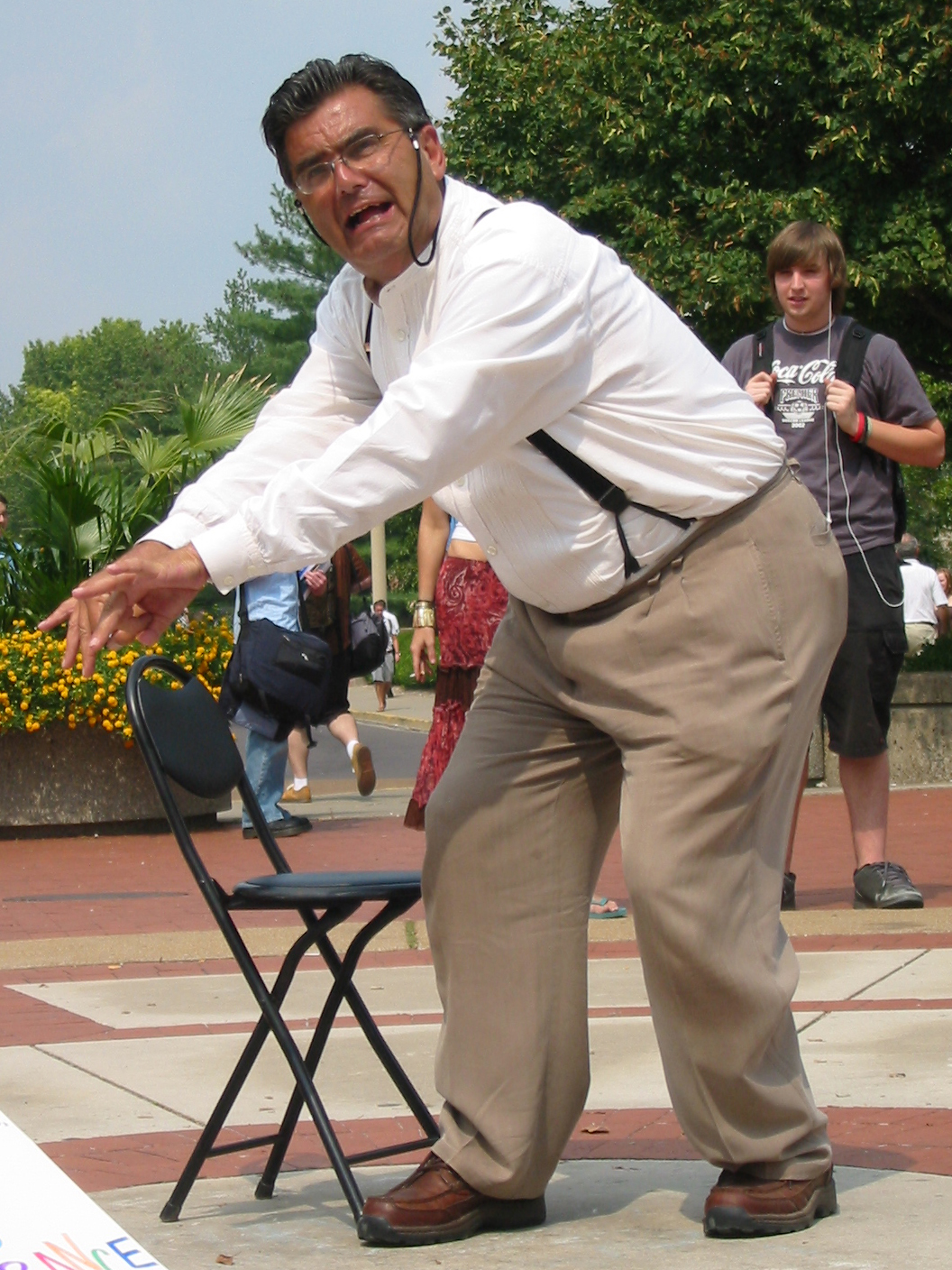
Brother Jed on Speakers Circle in September 2005

Smock authored a spiritual autobiography titled Who Will Rise Up? in which he recounts his unruly youth and conversion experience and defends his confrontational approach to evangelism.

Smock and his wife, Cindy, used a distinctive preaching style, termed "confrontational evangelism" in the subtitle of his autobiography. Their controversial variant of evangelism is shared by some street and campus preachers, who hope that a spiritual rebuke will force those they consider sinners to repent. In his autobiography, Smock referred to his college evangelical group as "The Destroyers", but this name is not presently being used on his website.

College newspapers have reported some of his statements: "I don't know how the whorehouses in this town stay open—all of you sorority girls are giving it away for free!" and "Who are you, Bob Marley?" (addressed to a black student with dreadlocks). He often shouted, "A masturbator today is a homosexual tomorrow." His assistants carried signs declaring that feminists, liberals, and those who listen to rock and roll are destined for Hell, along with homosexuals, fornicators, those who use tampons, and masturbators. As a result of his aggressive, rude, and confrontational style of preaching, Brother Jed was frequently mocked and accused of intolerance.

Besides issues relating to coarse language with immodest sexual references, Smock claimed to be sinless, holding a position called Christian perfection. He held to Pelagianism, identifying himself with the teachings of Pelagius. In addition, he held a view of God that denied that goodness is an essential attribute of God's nature.

== Fictional portrayals ==
Smock's character was the basis of the 2012 short, Battle of the Sects, in which an extreme evangelical preacher visits a university only to be run out by the campus Christians.

== See also ==
- List of campus preachers
