= Boxer shorts =

Men's loose-fitting underpants

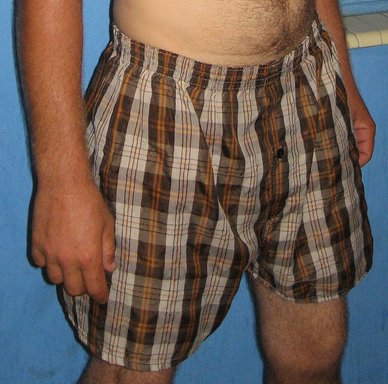
A man wearing boxers

Boxer shorts (also commonly known as simply boxers) are a type of undergarment typically worn by men. The term has been used in English since 1944 for all-around-elastic shorts, so named after the shorts worn by boxers, for whom unhindered leg movement (footwork) is very important. Boxers come in a variety of styles and design but are characterized by their loose fit.

== History ==
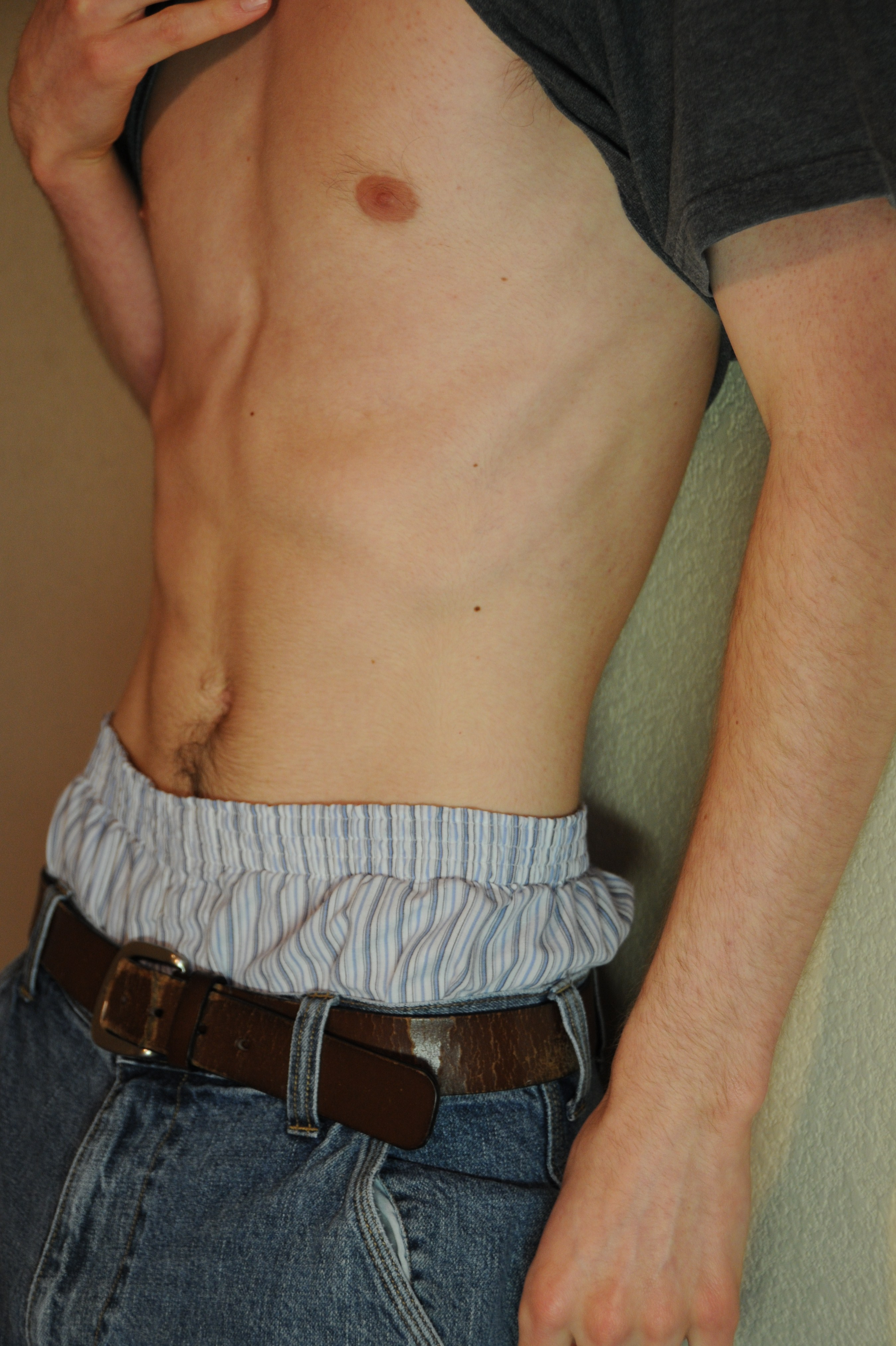
Man wearing jeans over boxer shorts

In 1925, Jacob Golomb, founder of Everlast, designed elastic-waist trunks to replace the leather-belted trunks then worn by boxers. These trunks, now known as boxer trunks, immediately became famous, but were later eclipsed by the popular Jockey-style briefs beginning in the late 1930s. The two styles, briefs and boxer shorts, had varying ratios of sales for the following fifty years, with strong regional and generational preferences.

In 1985, in the U.S. men's briefs were more popular than boxer shorts, with four times as many briefs sold compared to boxers. Around that time many of the men who preferred boxers were older men who became accustomed to wearing them during their time in the U.S. military, and best selling color of boxers was white.

Boxer shorts got a fashion boost in 1985 when English model and musician Nick Kamen stripped to white Sunspel boxers in a 1950s-style launderette in a Levi's commercial. After that time boxers were beginning to become popular among young men, who wore boxers with varying colors and prints.

Since the 1990s, some men also opt for boxer briefs as a compromise between the two. As of 2006, one American manufacturer reported that woven boxer shorts made up 15–20 per cent of men's underwear sales, but had been declining in popularity compared to boxer briefs since 2003.

== Design ==
Boxer shorts with one fly button

Most boxer shorts have a fly in front. Boxer shorts manufacturers have a couple of methods of closing the fly: metal snaps or a button or two. However, many boxer shorts on the market do not need a fastening mechanism to close up the fly as the fabric is cut and the boxers are designed to sufficiently overlap and fully cover the opening. This is commonly known as an open fly design.

Since boxer shorts’ fabric is rarely stretchy, a balloon seat, a generous panel of loosely fitting fabric in the center rear of the shorts, is designed to accommodate the wearer's various movements, especially bending forward. The most common sewing design of boxer shorts are made with a panel seat that has two seams running on the outer edges of the back seating area, creating a center rear panel. Most mass-produced commercial boxer shorts are made using this design.

Gripper boxer shorts with one snap and one fly button

Two less common forms of boxer shorts are gripper boxers and yoke-front boxers. Gripper boxers have an elastic waistband like regular boxers but have snaps, usually three, on the fly and on the waistband so that they open up completely.

Yoke-front boxer shorts with three yoke snaps and an open fly

Yoke front boxers are similar to gripper boxers in that the wide waistband yoke can be opened up completely, and the yoke usually has three snaps to close it while the fly itself, below, has no closure mechanism. There are two types of yoke boxers: one in which there is a short piece of elastic on each side of the waistband which snugs up the yoke to fit the waist; and tie-sides which have narrow cloth tapes on each side of the waist yoke, like strings, which are tightened and knotted by the wearer to make an exact fit. This style of underpant was very common during World War II, when the rubber needed for elastic waistbands had to be used for military purposes.

Boxer shorts are available in white and solid colors including pastels, and come in a variety of patterns and prints as well; Traditional patterns include geometrics (small repeating geometric designs), plaids and vertical stripes. Additionally, there are innumerable novelty boxer short patterns. Boxer shorts are produced using various fabrics including all cotton, cotton–polyester blends, jersey knits, satin, and silk.

== Fertility ==
Some studies have suggested that tight underpants (like briefs) and high temperature are not optimally conducive for sperm production. The testicles are outside the body for cooling because they operate for sperm production at a slightly lower temperature than the rest of the body, and boxer shorts allow the testicles to operate within the required temperature range. The compression of the genitals in briefs, boxer briefs, or thongs may cause the temperature to rise and sperm production to fall. There is a similar theory regarding testicular cancer risk. Other sources dispute this theory. A study in the October 1998 Journal of Urology, for example, concluded that underwear type is unlikely to have a significant effect on male fertility.

== Boxer shorts for women ==
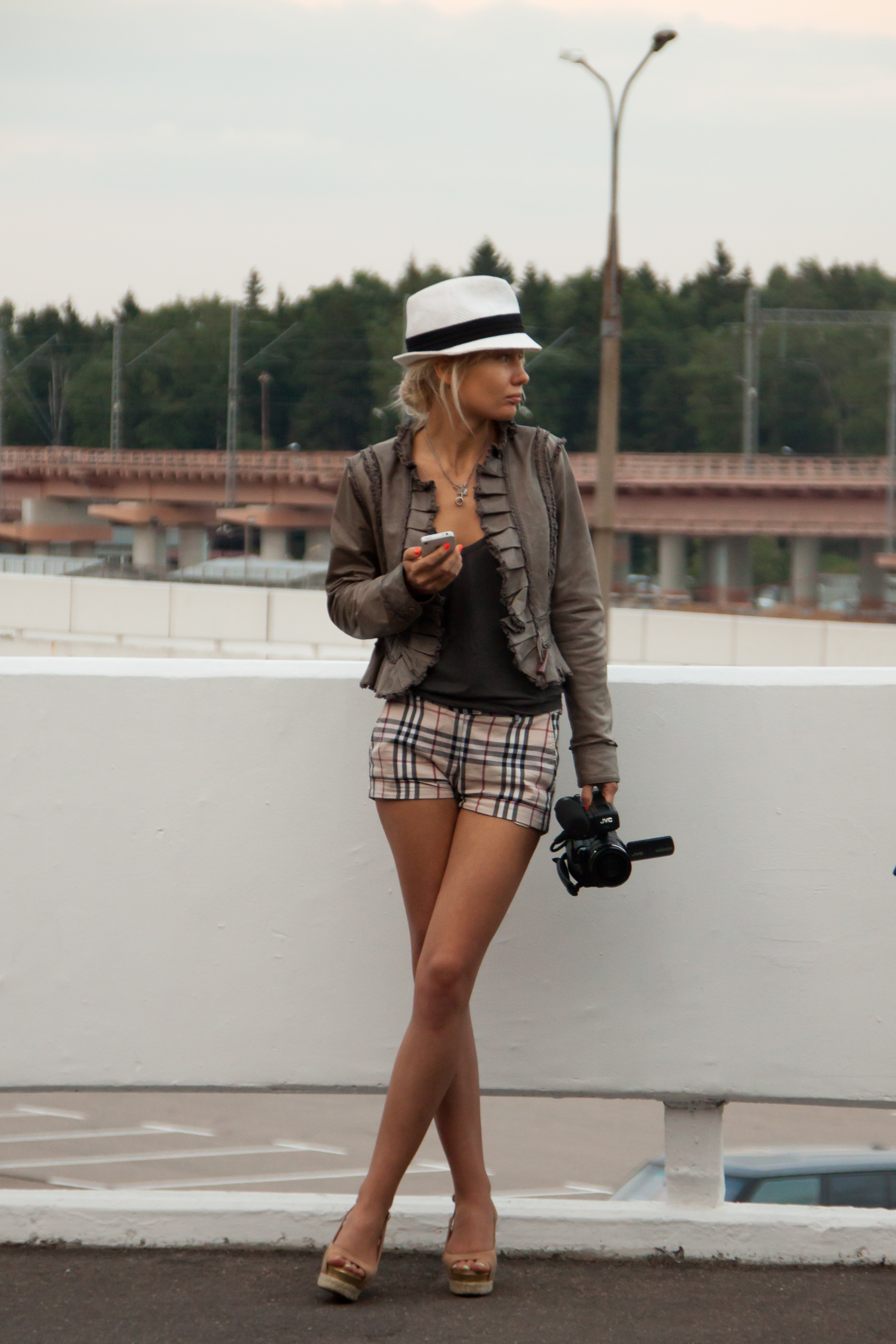
A woman wearing shorts with a pattern similar to common boxer styles, 2013

In the 2020s, boxer shorts have grown in popularity among women as loungewear or as underwear. Women have purchased men's boxers as well as boxers marketed specifically to women.

== In popular culture ==
In 1975, a Sears catalog photo of boxer shorts created a recurring urban legend. A model appeared to have part of his penis exposed in the photo, which a Sears spokesperson stated was a printing defect. Despite widespread press interest at the time, Sears reported that only a few letters were received from the general public, and noted that when the image was reprinted in the Spring-Summer catalog, it showed no such flaw. No recall of the catalog occurred. The incident inspired the singer Zoot Fenster's 1975 single "The Man on Page 602".

A noticeable comedy routine that involves boxer shorts, most notably used in cartoons, is to have a character wear boxer shorts that has a humorous print or pattern on them (usually hearts or polka-dots) when one's trousers had fallen down or ripped apart.

== See also ==
- Kacchera
- French knickers
