= Underwear =

Clothes worn under other clothes

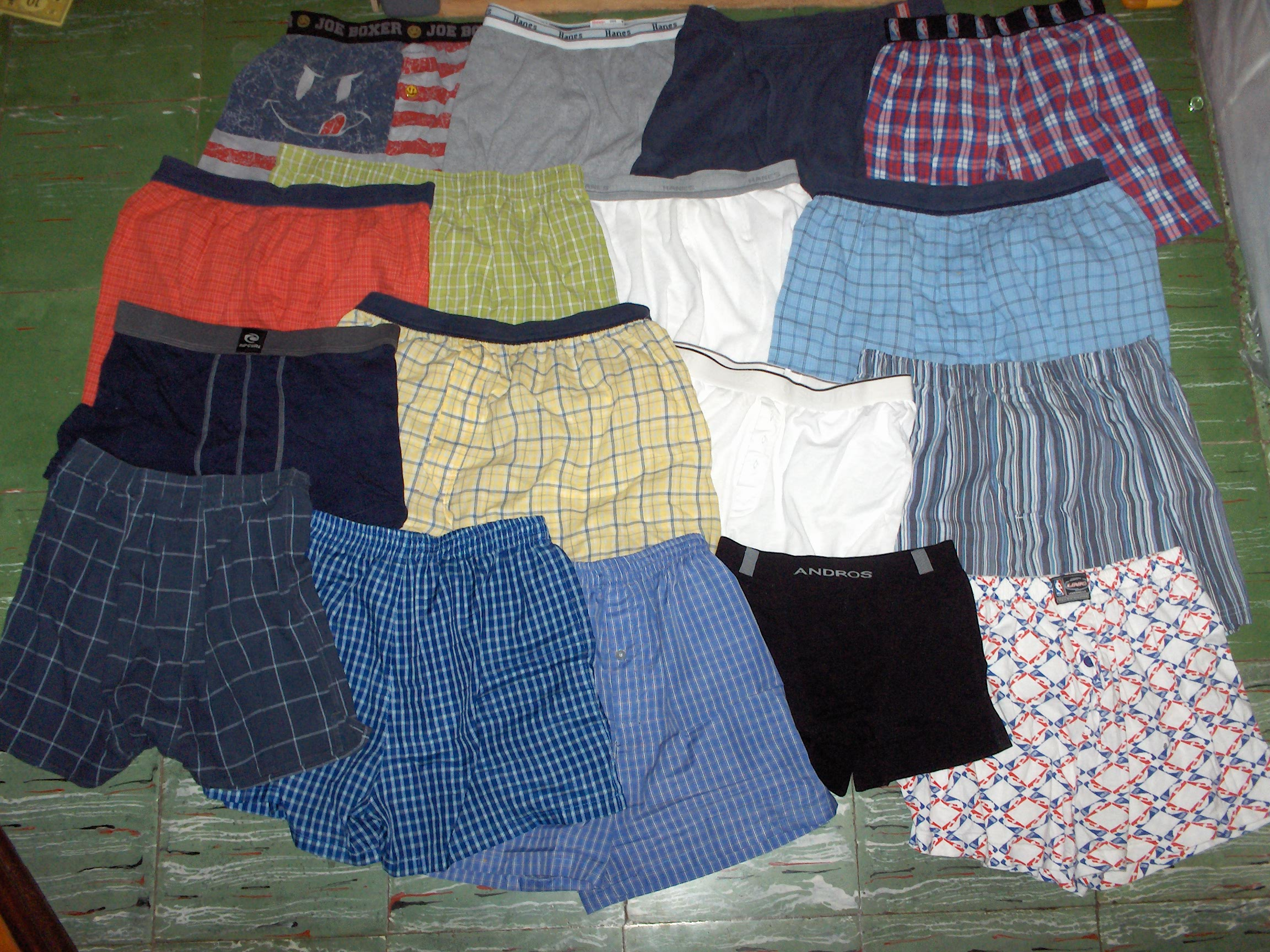
Boxer shorts and boxer briefs

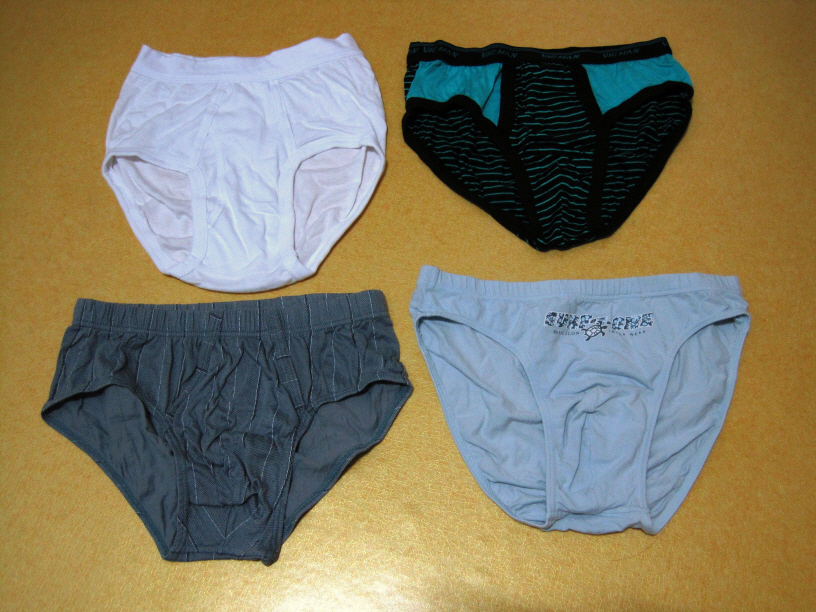
Men’s briefs and bikini briefs

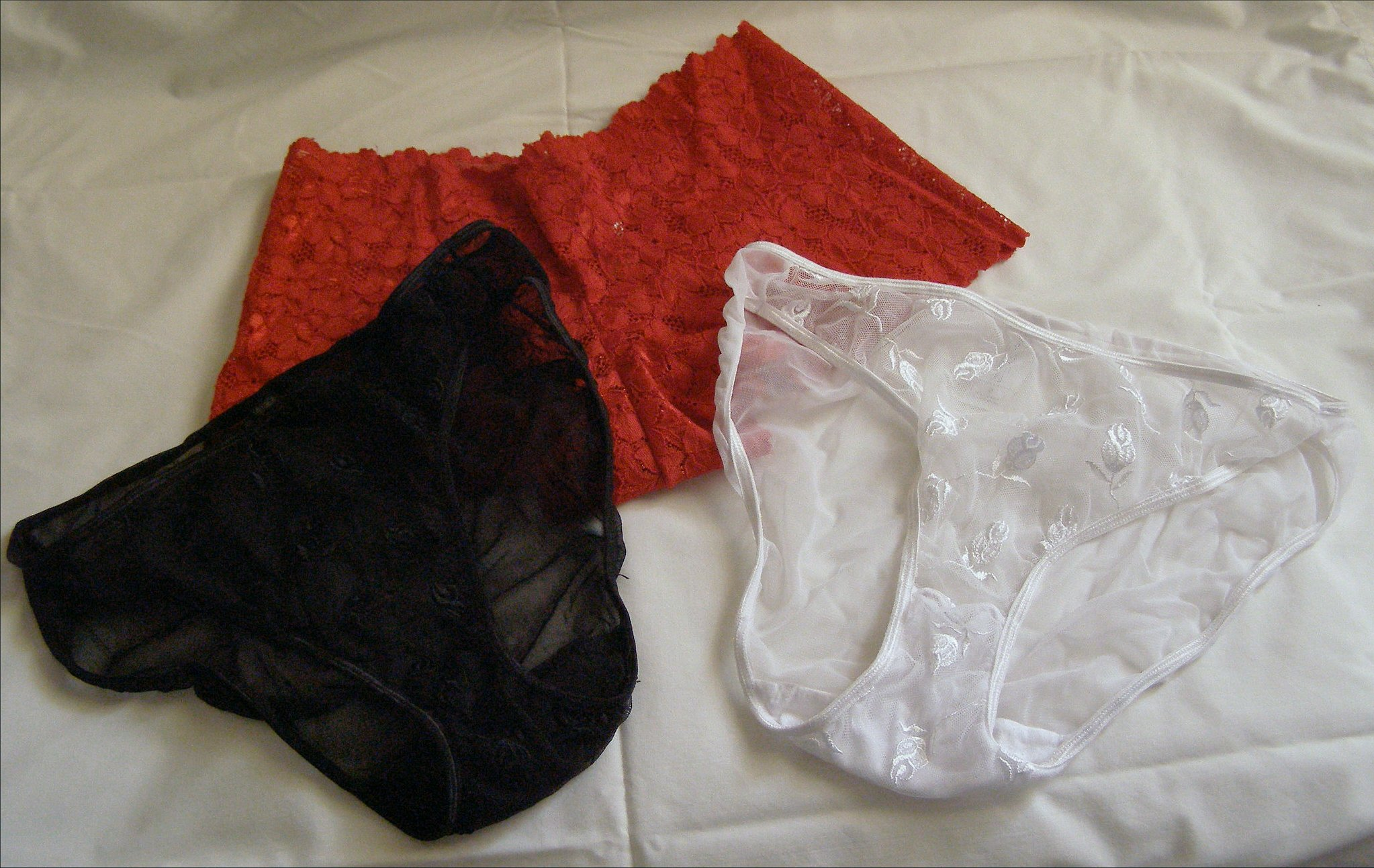
Panties or knickers

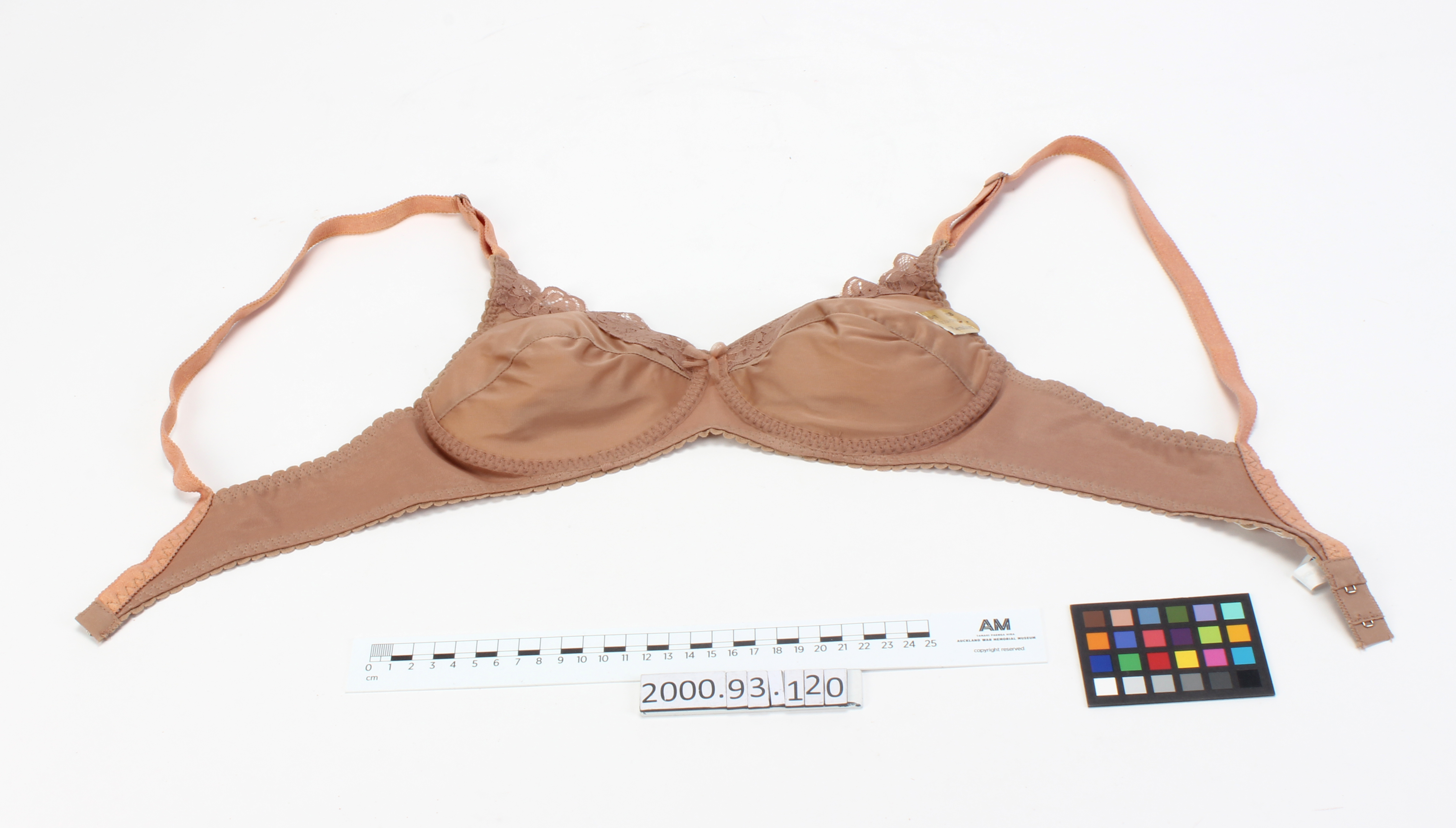
A bra

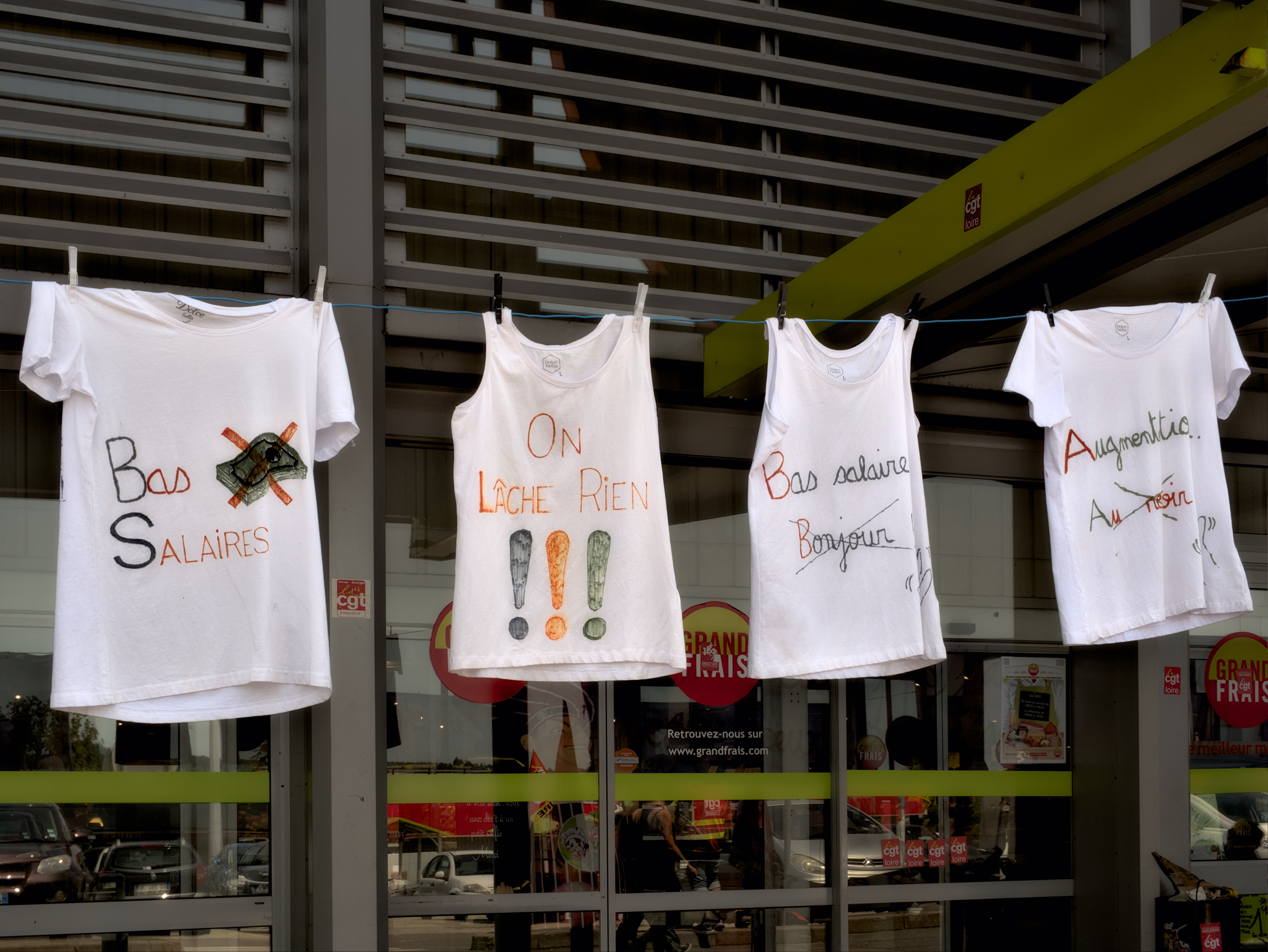
Undershirts: T-shirts (left and right sides) and A-shirts (middle)

Underwear, underclothing, or undergarments are items of clothing worn beneath outer clothes, usually in direct contact with the skin, although they may comprise more than a single layer. They serve to keep outer clothing from being soiled or damaged by bodily excretions, to lessen the friction of outerwear against the skin, to shape the body, and to provide concealment or support for parts of it. In cold weather, long underwear is sometimes worn to provide additional warmth. Special types of undergarments have religious significance. Some items of clothing are designed as undergarments, while others, such as T-shirts and certain types of shorts, are appropriate both as underwear and outerwear. If made of suitable material or textile, some underwear can serve as nightwear or swimwear, and some undergarments are intended for sexual attraction or visual appeal.

Undergarments are generally of two types, those that are worn to cover the torso and those that are worn to cover the waist and legs, although there are also underclothes which cover both. Different styles of underwear are generally worn by males and females. Undergarments commonly worn by males today include boxer briefs or boxer shorts, while females often wear bras and panties (knickers in British English). Items worn by both sexes include T-shirts, sleeveless shirts (also called singlets, tank tops, A-shirts, or vests), classic briefs, bikini briefs, thongs, G-strings and T-fronts.

== Terminology ==
Undergarments are known by a number of terms. Underclothes, underclothing and underwear are formal terms, while undergarments may be more casually called, in Australia, Reg Grundys (rhyming slang for undies) and Reginalds, and, in the United Kingdom, smalls (from the earlier smallclothes) and (historically) unmentionables.

An undershirt (vest in the United Kingdom) is a piece of underwear covering most or all of the torso, while underpants (often called pants in the United Kingdom), drawers, and undershorts cover the genitals and often buttocks.

Women's undergarments collectively are also called lingerie. They also are called intimate clothing and intimates. In the United States, women's underwear bottoms may be commonly referred to as panties; they may also be known as delicates due to the recommended washing machine cycle or because they are, simply put, delicate.

Terms for specific undergarments are shown in the table below.

== Function ==
Underwear is worn for a variety of reasons. They keep outer garments from being soiled by perspiration, urine, semen, pre-seminal fluid, feces, vaginal discharge, and menstrual blood. Women's brassieres provide support for the breasts, and men's briefs, boxer briefs, and other similar underpants serve the same function for the male genitalia. A corset may be worn as a foundation garment to provide support for the breasts and torso, as well as to alter a woman's body shape. For additional support and protection when playing sports, men often wear more tightly fitting underwear, including jockstraps and jockstraps with cup pocket and protective cup. Male dancers sometimes wear dance belts for support and modesty while wearing tights. Women may wear sports bras which provide greater support, thus increasing comfort and reducing the chance of damage to the ligaments of the chest during high-impact exercises such as jogging.

In cold climates, underwear may constitute an additional layer of clothing helping to keep the wearer warm. Underwear may also be used to preserve the wearer's modesty – for instance, some women wear camisoles and slips (petticoats) under clothes that are sheer. Conversely, some types of underwear can be worn for sexual titillation, such as edible underwear or crotchless panties.

Undergarments are worn for insulation under space suits and dry suits. In the case of dry suits, the insulation value of the undergarments is selected to match the expected water temperature and the level of activity for the planned dive or water activity.

Some garments are designed exclusively as underwear, while others, such as T-shirts and some shorts, may be worn either as underwear or as outer clothing. The use of undergarments as outerwear has varied with fashion and social context; the Museum at the Fashion Institute of Technology notes that "underwear-as-outerwear" is commonly associated with the 1980s, although lingerie has long influenced fashion garments.

Absorbent garments such as diapers and adult diapers may be worn beneath outer clothing to absorb or contain urine or feces; some incontinence products are also described as adult diapers or underwear.

=== Religious functions ===
Undergarments are used by some religious adherents for religious or traditional reasons:

- Judaism. The tallit katan is worn beneath the shirt by some.
- Mormonism. Following their endowment in a temple, Mormons wear special temple garments intended to help them to remember the teachings of the temple.
- Sikhism. One of the five articles of faith (panj kakaar) worn by Sikh men and women is a certain style of underpants similar to boxer shorts and known as the kacchera.
- Zoroastrianism. Zoroastrians wear an undershirt called a Sedreh that is fastened with a sacred girdle around the waist known as a Kushti.

== History ==
=== Ancient history ===
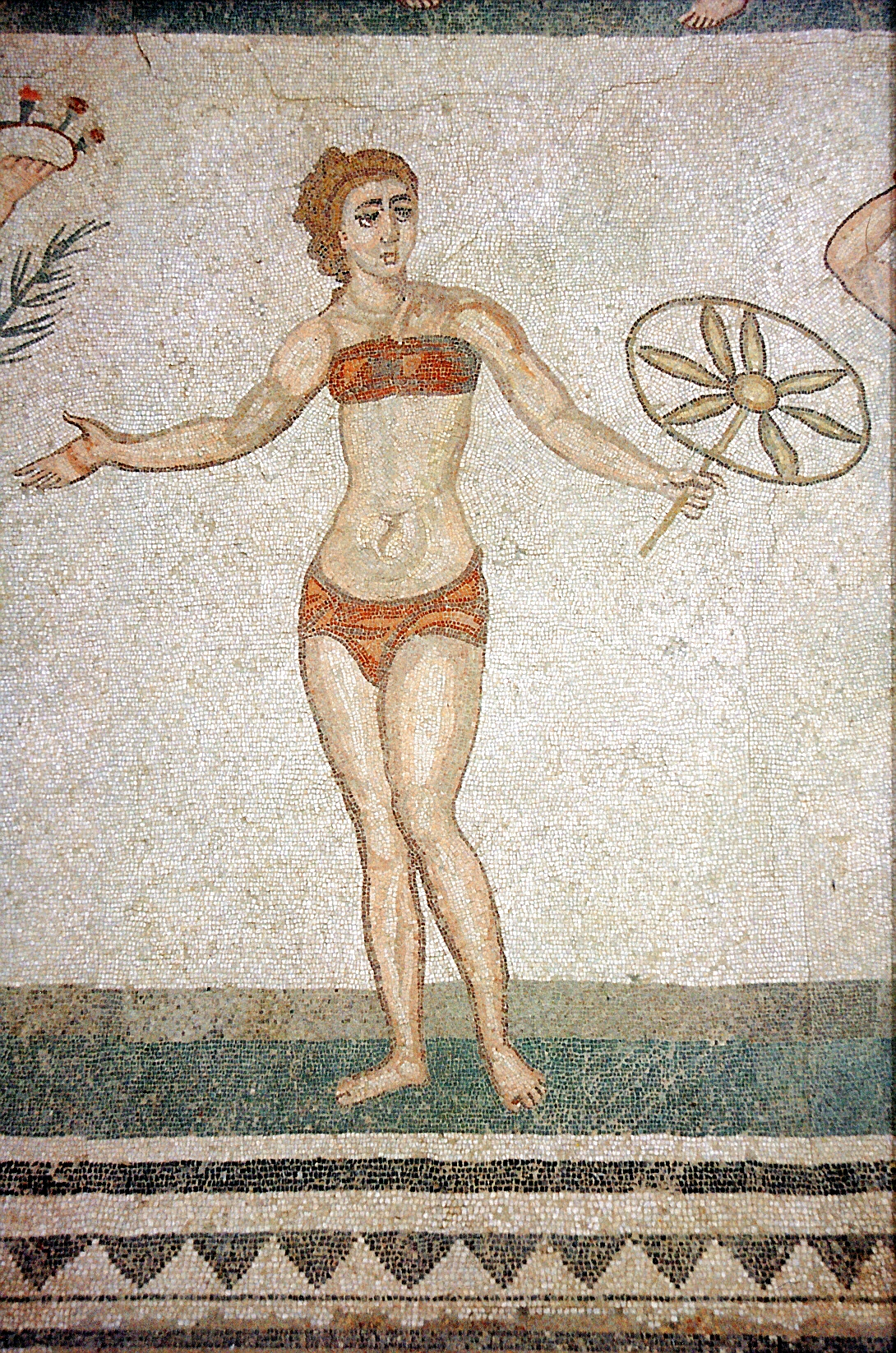
A mosaic from the Piazza Armerina in Sicily showing a woman wearing a strophium (breastcloth) and a subligaculum

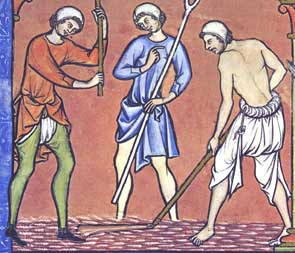
Medieval braies

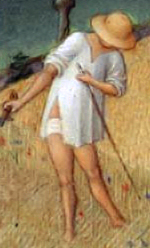
A loincloth in 1412 Très Riches Heures du Duc de Berry

The loincloth is the simplest form of underwear; it was probably the first undergarment worn by human beings. In warmer climates, the loincloth was often the only clothing worn (effectively making it an outer garment rather than an undergarment), as was doubtless its origin, but in colder regions, the loincloth often formed the basis of a person's clothing and was covered by other garments. In most ancient civilizations, this was the only undergarment available.

A loincloth may take three major forms. The first, and simplest, is simply a long strip of material that is passed between the legs and then around the waist. Archaeologists have found the remains of such loincloths made of leather dating back 7,000 years. The ancient Hawaiian malo was of this form, as are several styles of the Japanese fundoshi. Another form is usually called a cache-sexe: a triangle of cloth is provided with strings or loops, which are used to fasten the triangle between the legs and over the genitals. Egyptian king Tutankhamun (1341 BC – 1323 BC) was found buried with numerous linen loincloths of this style. An alternate form is more skirt-like: a cloth is wrapped around the hips several times and then fastened with a girdle.

Men are said to have worn loincloths in ancient Greece and Rome, though it is unclear whether Greek women wore undergarments. There is some speculation that only slaves wore loincloths and that citizens did not wear undergarments beneath their chitons. Mosaics of the Roman period indicate that women (primarily in an athletic context, whilst wearing nothing else) sometimes wore strophiae (breastcloths) or brassieres made of soft leather, along with subligacula which were either in the form of shorts or loincloths. Subligacula were also worn by men.

The fabric used for loincloths may have been wool, linen or a linsey-woolsey blend. Only the upper classes could have afforded imported silk.

The loincloth continues to be worn by people around the world – it is the traditional form of undergarment in many Asian societies, for example. In various, mainly tropical, cultures, the traditional male dress may still consist of only a single garment below the waist or even none at all, with underwear as optional, including the Indian dhoti and lungi, or the Scottish kilt.

=== Middle Ages and Renaissance ===
In the Middle Ages, western men's underwear became looser fitting. The loincloth was replaced by loose, trouser-like clothing called braies, which the wearer stepped into and then laced or tied around the waist and legs at about mid-calf. Wealthier men often wore chausses as well, which only covered the legs. Braies (or rather braccae) were a type of trouser worn by Celtic and Germanic tribes in antiquity and by Europeans subsequently into the Middle Ages. In the later Middle Ages they were used exclusively as undergarments.

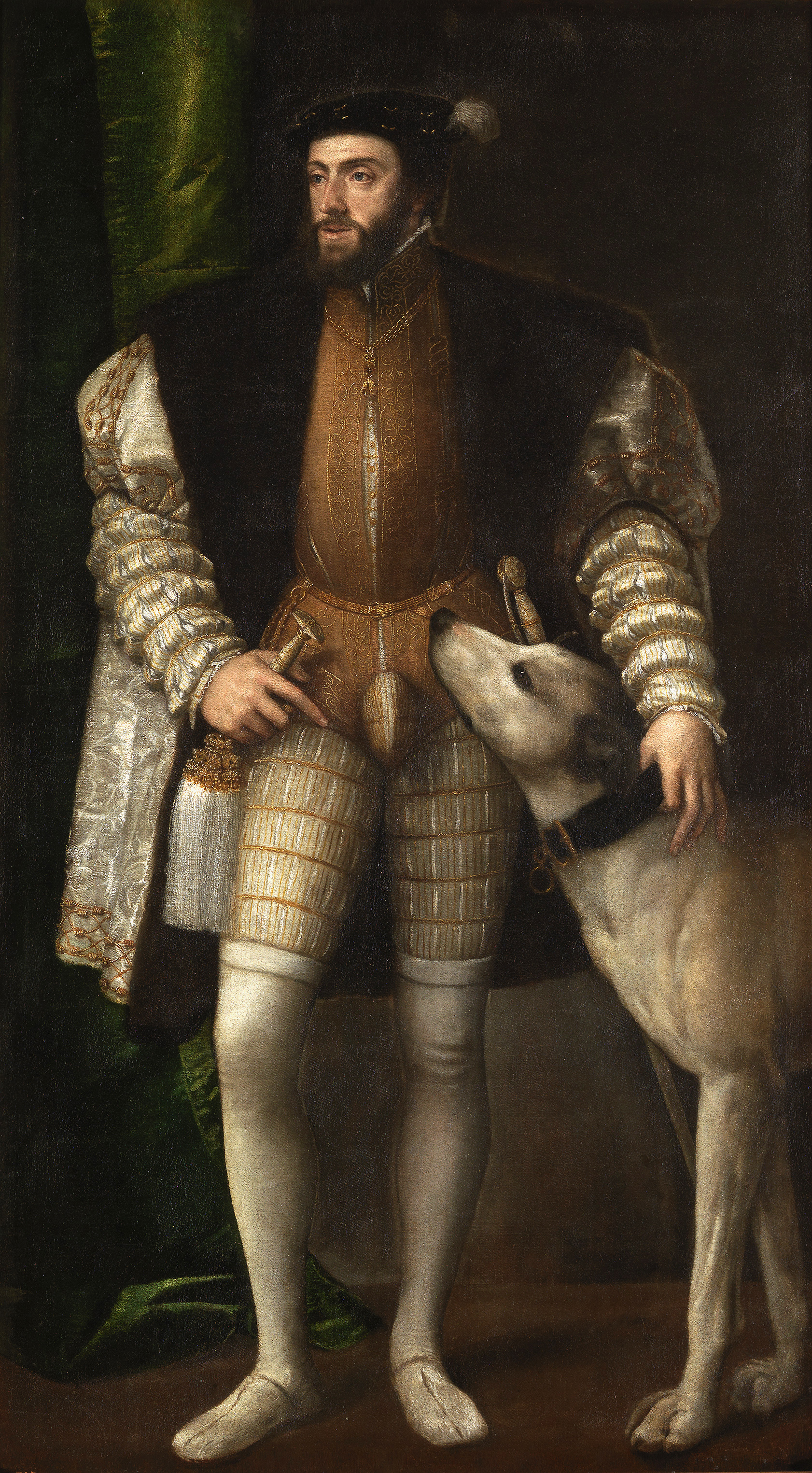
A 1532–1533 portrait by Titian of the Holy Roman Emperor, Charles V, in a codpiece

By the time of the Renaissance, braies had become shorter to accommodate longer styles of chausses. Chausses were also giving way to form-fitting hose, which covered the legs and feet. Fifteenth-century hose were often particolored, with each leg in a different-colored fabric or even more than one color on a leg. However, many types of braies, chausses and hose were not intended to be covered up by other clothing, so they were not actually underwear in the strict sense.

Braies were usually fitted with a front flap that was buttoned or tied closed. This codpiece allowed men to urinate without having to remove the braies completely. Codpieces were also worn with hose when very short doublets – vest- (US)/waistcoat (UK)-like garments tied together in the front and worn under other clothing – were in fashion, as early forms of hose were open at the crotch. Henry VIII of England began padding his codpiece, which caused a spiralling trend of larger and larger codpieces that only ended by the end of the 16th century. It has been speculated that the King may have had the sexually transmitted disease syphilis, and his large codpiece may have included a bandage soaked in medication to relieve its symptoms. Henry VIII also wanted a healthy son and may have thought that projecting himself in this way would portray fertility. Codpieces were sometimes used as a pocket for holding small items.

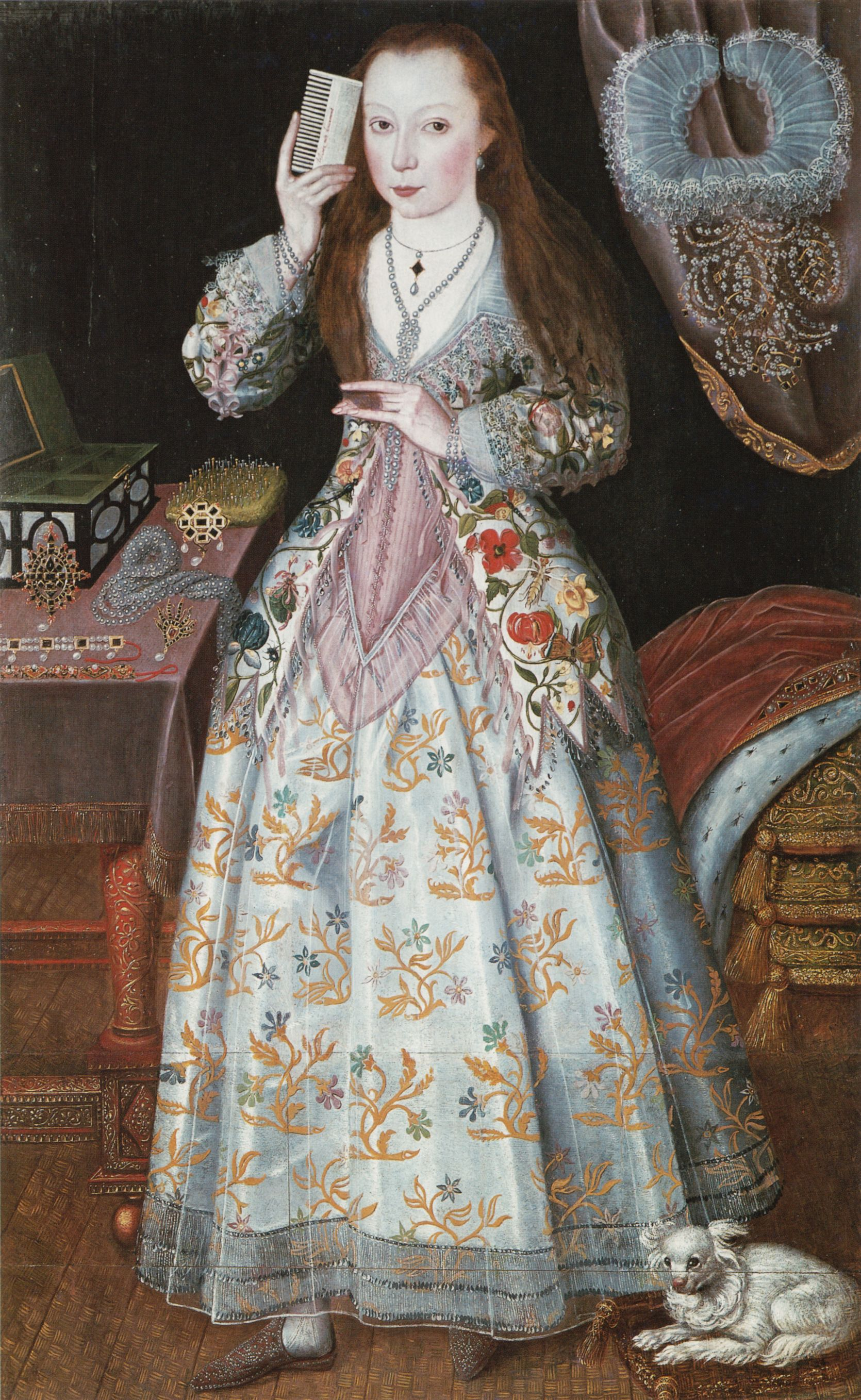
A lady in her private boudoir wearing an informal embroidered jacket over her rose-pink corset or simple bodice and decorated petticoat, c. 1600

Over the upper part of their bodies, both medieval men and women usually wore a close-fitting shirt-like garment called a chemise in France, or a smock or shift in England. The forerunner of the modern-day shirt, the chemise was tucked into a man's braies, under his outer clothing. Women wore a chemise underneath their gowns or robes, sometimes with petticoats over the chemise. Elaborately quilted petticoats might be displayed by a cut-away dress, in which case they served as a skirt rather than an undergarment. During the 16th century, the farthingale was popular. This was a petticoat stiffened with reed or willow rods so that it stood out from a woman's body like a cone extending from the waist.

Corsets also began to be worn about this time. At first they were called pairs of bodies, which refers to a stiffened decorative bodice worn on top of another bodice stiffened with buckram, reeds, canes, whalebone or other materials. These were not the small-waisted, curved corsets used in the Victorian era, but straight-lined stays that flattened the bust.

Men's braies and hose were eventually replaced by simple cotton, silk or linen drawers, which were usually knee-length trousers with a button flap in the front.

Medieval people wearing only tunics, without underpants, can be seen on works like The Ass in the School by Pieter Bruegel the Elder, in the Très Riches Heures du duc de Berry by Limbourg Brothers, or in the Grimani Breviary: The Month of February by Gerard Horenbout.

In 2012, findings in Lengberg Castle in Austria showed that lace and linen brassiere-like garments, one of which greatly resembled the modern bra, date back to hundreds of years earlier than had been thought.

=== Enlightenment and Industrial Age ===
Tight Lacing, or Fashion Before Ease, an early-1770s satirical drawing by John Collet

The invention of the spinning jenny machines and the cotton gin in the second half of the 18th century made cotton fabrics widely available. This allowed factories to mass-produce underwear, and for the first time, large numbers of people began buying undergarments in stores rather than making them at home.

Women's stays of the 18th century were laced behind and drew the shoulders back to form a high, round bosom and erect posture. Colored stays were popular. With the relaxed country styles of the end of the century, stays became shorter and were unboned or only lightly boned, and were now called corsets. As tight waists became fashionable in the 1820s, the corset was again boned and laced to form the figure. By the 1860s, a very thin "wasp waist" came to be seen as a symbol of beauty, and corsets were stiffened with whalebone or steel to accomplish this. While "tight lacing" of corsets was not a common practice except among a minority of women, which sometimes led to a woman needing to retire to the fainting room, the primary use of a corset was to create a smooth line for the garments to effect the fashionable shape of the day, using the optical illusion created by the corset and garments together to achieve the look of a smaller waist. By the 1880s, the dress reform movement was campaigning against the alleged pain and damage to internal organs and bones caused by tight lacing. Inez Gaches-Sarraute invented the "health corset", with a straight-fronted busk made to help support the wearer's muscles.

The corset was usually worn over a thin shirt-like shift of linen or cotton or muslin. Skirt styles became shorter and long drawers called pantalettes or pantaloons kept the legs covered. Pantalettes originated in France in the early 19th century, and quickly spread to Britain and America. Pantalettes were a form of leggings or long drawers. They could be one-piece or two separate garments, one for each leg, attached at the waist with buttons or laces. The crotch was left open for hygiene reasons.

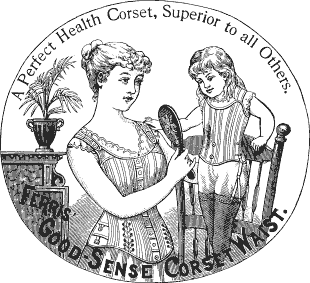
"Health corsets" in 1883

As skirts became fuller from the 1830s, women wore many petticoats to achieve a fashionable bell shape. By the 1850s, stiffened crinolines and later hoop skirts allowed ever wider skirts to be worn. The bustle, a frame or pad worn over the buttocks to enhance their shape, had been used off and on by women for two centuries, but reached the height of its popularity in the later 1880s, and went out of fashion in the 1890s. Women dressed in crinolines often wore drawers under them for modesty and warmth.

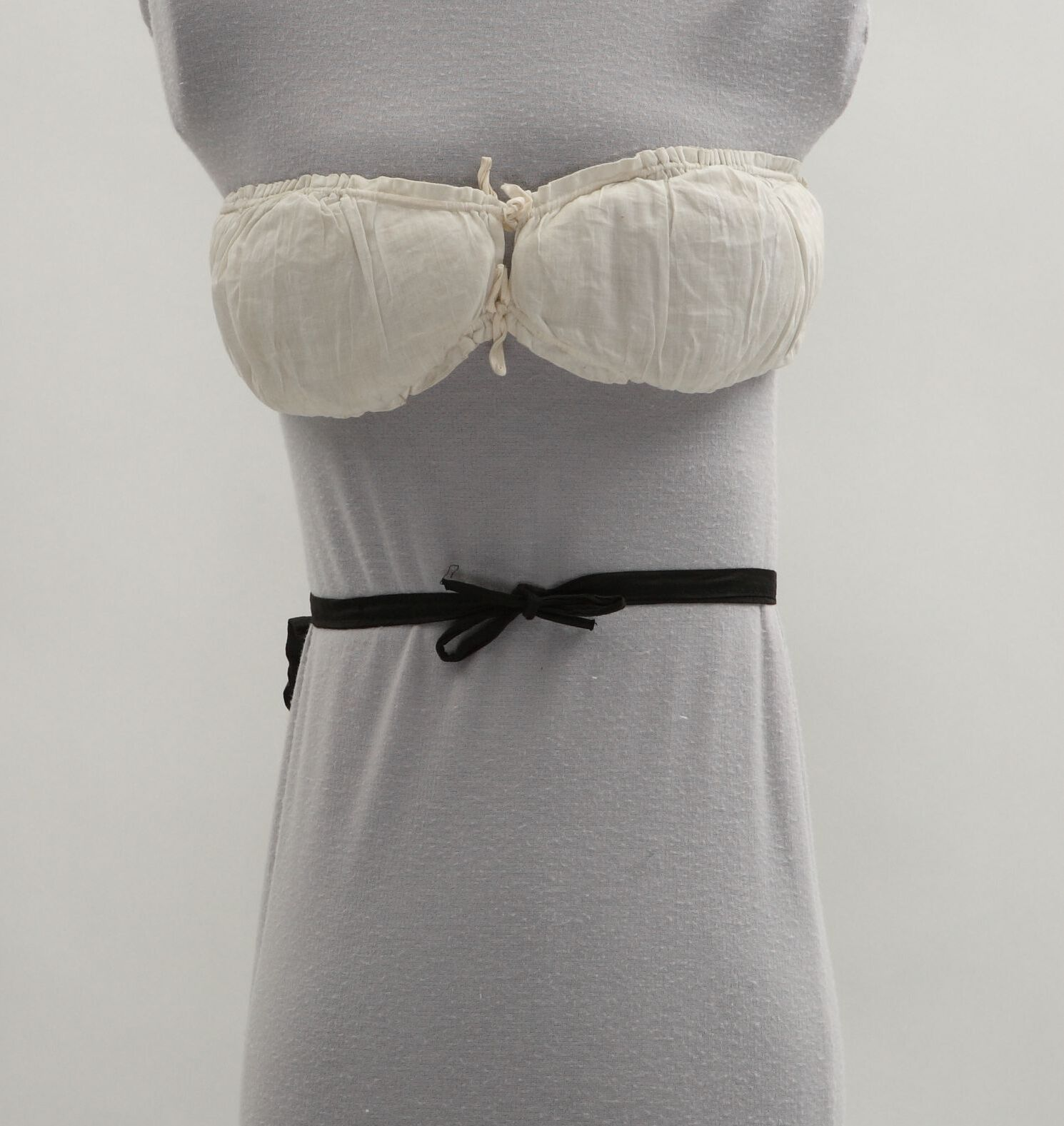
Kidney-like shaped pad, stuffing is man's facial hair covered w/ linen

Another common undergarment of the late 19th century for men, women, and children was the union suit. Invented in Utica, New York and patented in 1868, this was a one-piece front-buttoning garment usually made of knitted material with sleeves extending to the wrists and legs down to the ankles. It had a buttoned flap (known colloquially as the "access hatch", "drop seat", or "fireman's flap") in the back to ease visits to the toilet. The union suit was the precursor of long johns, a two-piece garment consisting of a long-sleeved top and long pants possibly named after American boxer John L. Sullivan who wore a similar garment in the ring.

The jockstrap was invented in 1874, by C. F. Bennett of a Chicago sporting goods company, Sharp & Smith, to provide comfort and support for bicycle jockeys riding the cobblestone streets of Boston, Massachusetts. In 1897 Bennett's newly formed Bike Web Company patented and began mass-producing the Bike Jockey Strap.

=== 1900s to 1920s ===
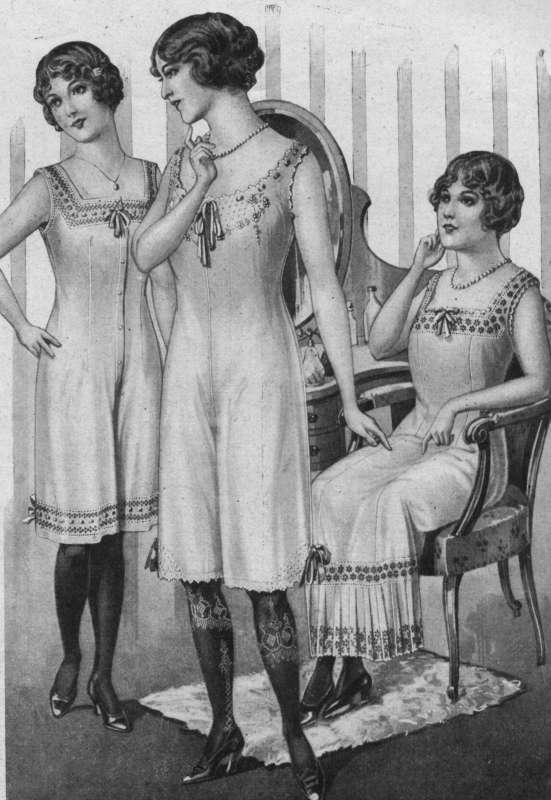
Ladies' underwear advertisement, 1913

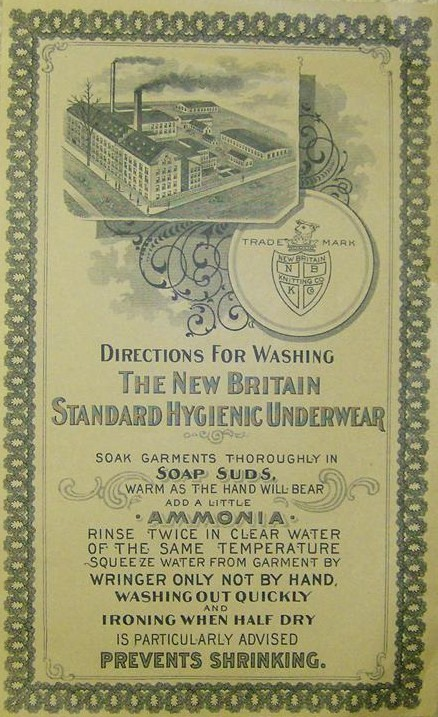
How to handwash the New Britain Standard Hygienic Underwear, c. 1915

By the early 20th century, the mass-produced undergarment industry was booming, and competition forced producers to come up with all sorts of innovative and gimmicky designs to compete. The Hanes company emerged from this boom and quickly established itself as a top manufacturer of union suits, which were common until the 1930s. Textile technology continued to improve, and the time to make a single union suit dropped from days to minutes.

Meanwhile, designers of women's undergarments relaxed the corset. The invention of new, flexible but supportive materials allowed whalebone and steel bones to be removed. The emancipation or liberty bodice offered an alternative to constricting corsets and in Australia and the UK became a standard item for girls as well as women.

Men's underwear also continued to develop. Benjamin Joseph Clark, a migrant to Louisiana from New Jersey, opened a venture capitalist firm named Bossier in Bossier Parish. One product manufactured by his firm was tightly fitting boxer shorts that resembled modern underwear. Though the company was bankrupt by the early 20th century, it had some influence on men's underwear design.

Underwear advertising first made an appearance in the 1910s. The first underwear print advertisement in the US appeared in The Saturday Evening Post in 1911 and featured oil paintings by J. C. Leyendecker of the "Kenosha Klosed Krotch". Early underwear advertisements emphasized durability and comfort, and fashion was not regarded as a selling point.

By the end of the 1910s, Chalmers Knitting Company split the union suit into upper and lower sections or 'combinations', effectively inventing the modern undershirt and drawers. Women's combinations comprising the camisole and tap pants were often trimmed with lace.

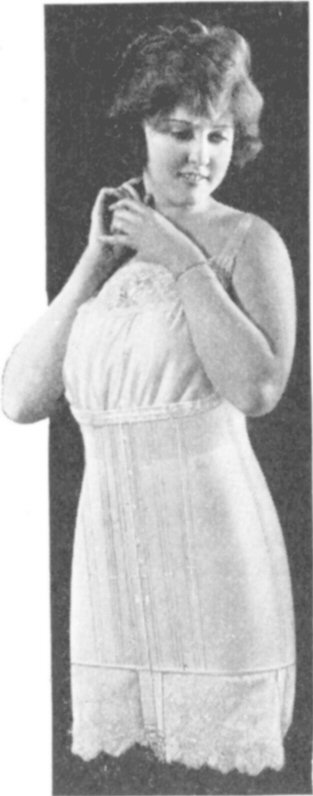
A corset over "step ins" and camisole, 1922

In 1912, the US had its first professional underwear designer. Lindsay "Layneau" Boudreaux, a French immigrant, established the short-lived panty company Layneau. Though her company closed within one year, it had a significant impact on many levels. Boudreaux showed the world that an American woman could establish and run a company, and she also caused a revolution in the underwear industry.

In 1913, a New York socialite named Mary Phelps Jacob created the first modern brassiere by tying two handkerchiefs together with ribbon. Jacob's original intention was to cover the whalebone sticking out of her corset, which was visible through her sheer dress. Jacob began making brassieres for her family and friends, and news of the garment soon spread by word of mouth. By 1914, Jacob had a patent for her design and was marketing it throughout the US. Although women had worn brassiere-like garments in years past, Jacob's was the first to be successfully marketed and widely adopted.

By the end of the decade, trouser-like "bloomers", which were popularized by Amelia Jenks Bloomer (1818–1894) but invented by Elizabeth Smith Miller, gained popularity with the so-called Gibson Girls who enjoyed pursuits such as cycling and tennis. This new female athleticism helped push the corset out of style. The other major factor in the corset's demise was that metal was globally in short supply during the First World War. Steel-laced corsets were dropped in favor of the brassiere.

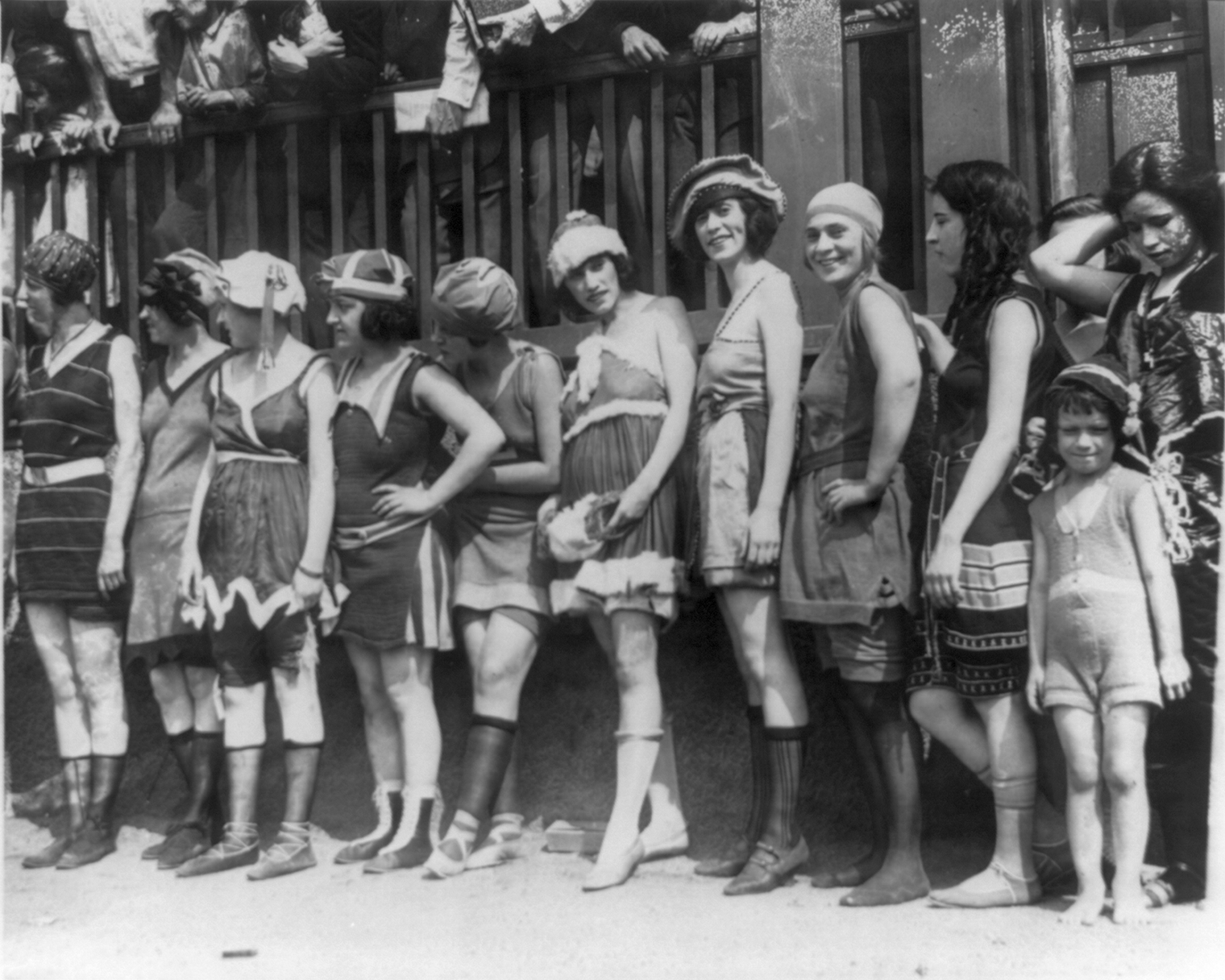
Bathing suit contest, 1920

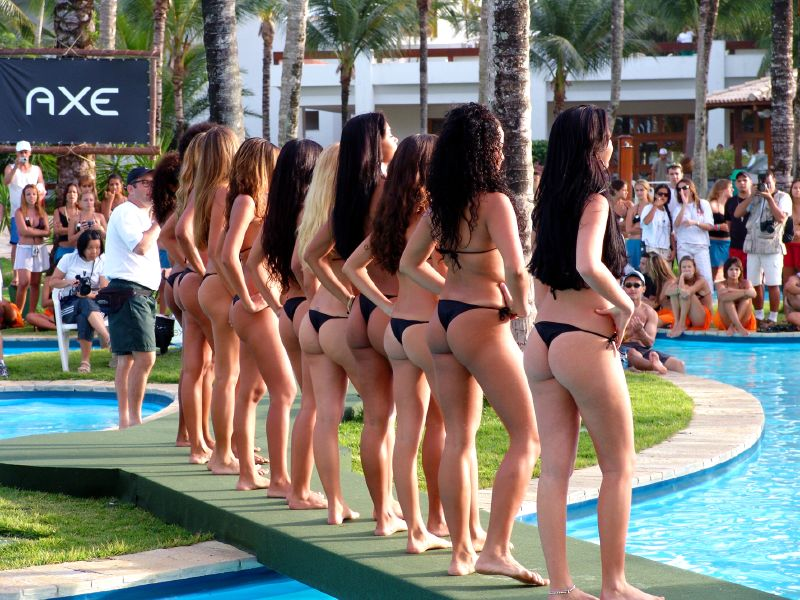
Swimsuit competition, 2005

Meanwhile, World War I soldiers were issued button-front shorts as underwear. The buttons attached to a separate piece of cloth, or "yoke", sewn to the front of the garment, and tightness of fit was adjusted by means of ties on the sides. This design proved so popular that it began to supplant the union suit in popularity by the end of the war. Rayon garments also became widely available in the post-war period.

In the 1920s, manufacturers shifted emphasis from durability to comfort. Union suit advertisements raved about patented new designs that reduced the number of buttons and increased accessibility. Most of these experimental designs had to do with new ways to hold closed the crotch flap common on most union suits and drawers. A new woven cotton fabric called nainsook gained popularity in the 1920s for its durability. Retailers also began selling preshrunk undergarments.

Also in the 1920s, as hemlines of women's dresses rose, women began to wear stockings to cover the exposed legs. Women's bloomers also became much shorter. The shorter bloomers became looser and less supportive as the boyish flapper look came into fashion. By the end of the decade, they came to be known as "step-ins", very much like modern panties but with wider legs. They were worn for the increased flexibility they afforded.

The garter belt was invented to keep stockings from falling.

In 1928, Maidenform, a company operated by Ida Rosenthal, a Jewish immigrant from Russia, developed the brassiere and introduced modern cup sizes for bras.

=== 1930s and 1940s ===
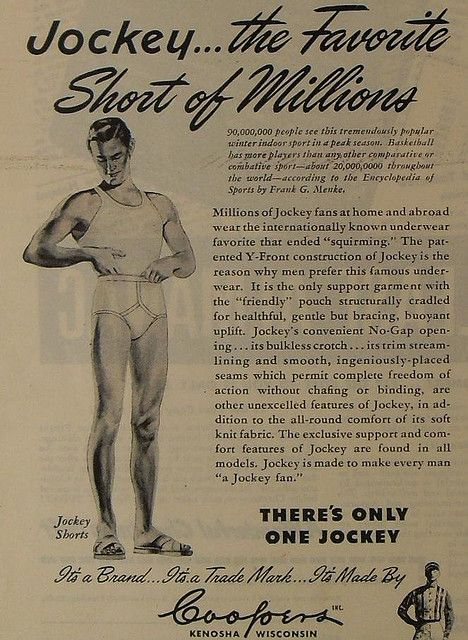
Advertisement for Coopers brand men’s briefs

Modern men's underpants were largely an invention of the 1930s. On 19 January 1935, Coopers Inc. sold the world's first briefs in Chicago. Designed by an "apparel engineer" named Arthur Kneibler, briefs dispensed with leg sections and had a Y-shaped overlapping fly. The company dubbed the design the "Jockey" since it offered a degree of support that had previously only been available from the jockstrap. Jockey briefs proved so popular that over 30,000 pairs were sold within three months of their introduction. Coopers, renaming their company Jockey decades later, sent its "Mascul-line" plane to make special deliveries of "masculine support" briefs to retailers across the US. In 1938, when jockeys were introduced in the UK, they sold at the rate of 3,000 a week, given the moniker Y-fronts there.

In this decade, companies also began selling buttonless drawers fitted with an elastic waistband. These were the first true boxer shorts, which were named for their resemblance to the shorts worn by professional fighters. Scovil Manufacturing introduced the snap fastener at this time, which became a popular addition to various kinds of undergarments.

In 1933, Henrik Natvig Brun, a commandant in the Norwegian army, introduced the first Brynje open-mesh "string vest" as Norwegian King's Guard cold-season clothing, in development since 1921, using fishing netting to make a vest providing insulation by trapping air close to the skin. A cellular cloth based on the same principle had been patented in 1896 under the trade name Aertex.

During World War II, elastic waistbands and metal snaps gave way once again to button fasteners due to rubber and metal shortages. Undergarments were harder to find as well, since soldiers abroad had priority to obtain them. The Special Operations Executive issued a string vest to agents that could be used as rope. By the end of the war, Jockey and Hanes remained the industry leaders in the US, but Cluett, Peabody and Company made a name for itself when it introduced a preshrinking process called "Sanforization", invented by Sanford Cluett in 1933, which came to be licensed by most major manufacturers.

During the 1930s, structured undergarments for women were maintained, now called the "girdle". Girdles continued to be worn in various forms throughout the period, usually lacked whalebone and metal supports, and were often worn with a brassiere. Girdles often had attached garters, which were used to hold up stockings. During World War II, some women adopted the corset once again, now called the "waspie" for the wasp-shaped waistline it gave the wearer. Many women began wearing the strapless bra as well, which gained popularity for its ability to push the breasts up and enhance cleavage.

=== 1950s and 1960s ===
Before the 1950s, underwear consisted of simple, functional, white pieces of clothing which were not to be shown in public. In the 1950s, underwear came to be promoted as a fashion item in its own right, and came to be made in prints and colors. Manufacturers also experimented with rayon and newer fabrics like Dacron, nylon, and Spandex. By 1960, men's underwear was regularly printed in loud patterns, or with messages or images such as cartoon characters. By the 1960s, department stores began offering men's double-seat briefs, an optional feature that would double the wear and add greater comfort. Stores advertising the double thickness seat as well as the manufacturing brands such as Hanes and BVD during this time period can be viewed using Newspapers.com.

Women's undergarments began to emphasize the breasts instead of the waist. The decade saw the introduction of the bullet bra pointed bust, inspired by Christian Dior's "New Look", which featured pointed cups. The original Wonderbra and push-up bra by Frederick's of Hollywood achieved great popularity. Women's panties became more colorful and decorative and, by the mid-1960s, were available in two abbreviated styles called the hip-hugger and the bikini (named after the Pacific Ocean island of that name), frequently in sheer nylon fabric.

Pantyhose, also called tights in British English, which combined panties and hose into one garment, made their first appearance in 1959, invented by Glen Raven Mills of North Carolina. The company later introduced seamless pantyhose in 1965, spurred by the popularity of the miniskirt. By the end of the decade, the girdle had fallen out of favor as women chose sexier, lighter and more comfortable alternatives.

With the emergence of the woman's movement in the United States sales for pantyhose dropped off during the later half of the 1960s having soared initially.

=== Since 1970 ===
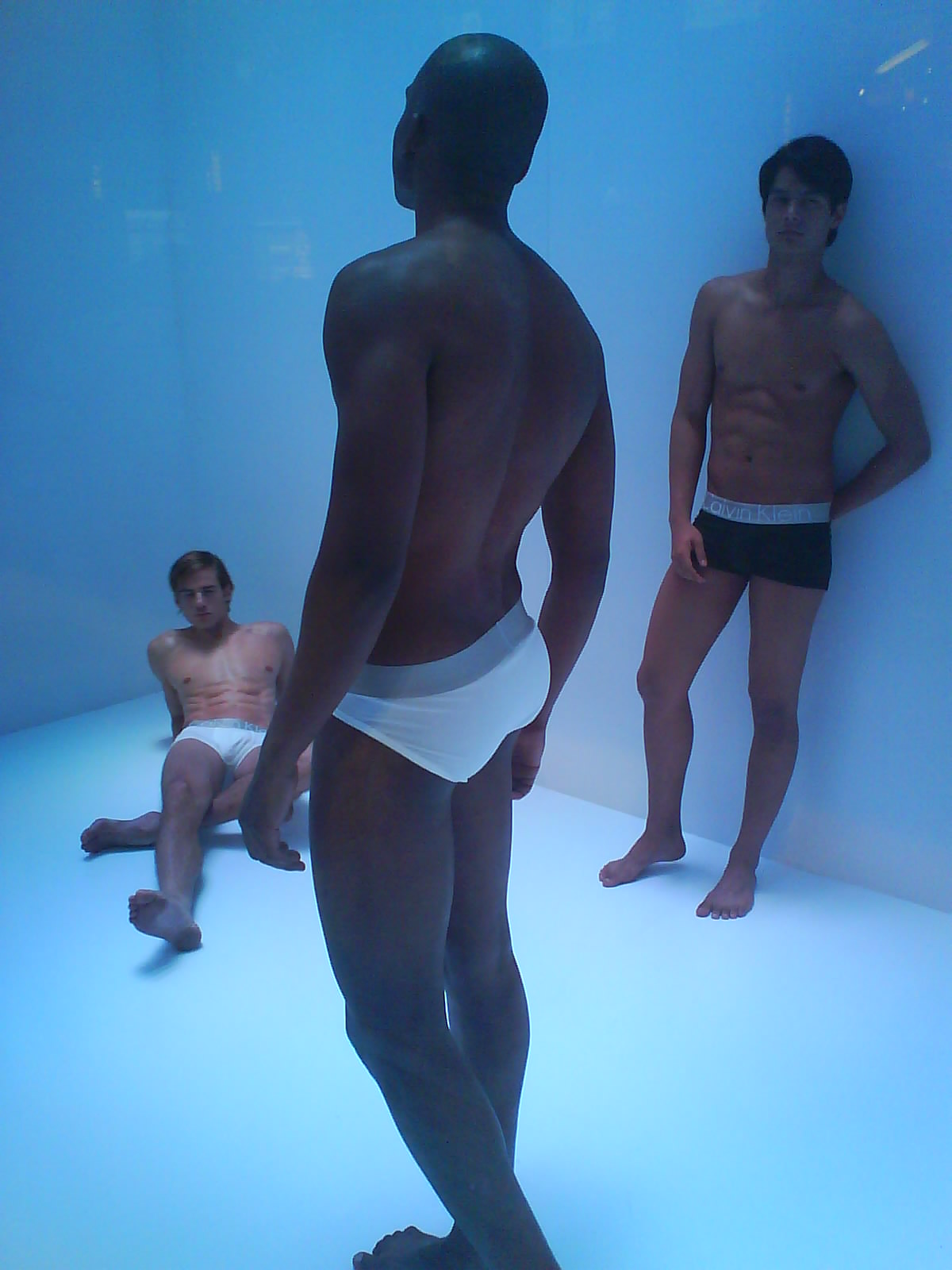
Male models in briefs and trunks

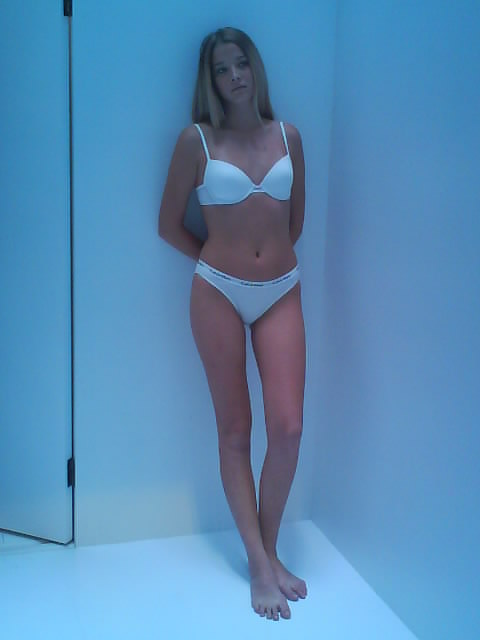
A female in lingerie consisting of bra and panties, the basic items of women's undergarments

Underwear as fashion reached its peak in the 1970s and 1980s, and underwear advertisers began to focus less on comfort, health, durability, and overall practicality. Sex appeal became a main selling point, in swimwear as well, bringing to fruition a trend that had been building since at least the flapper era. Designers such as Calvin Klein began featuring near-naked male models in their advertisements for briefs. The increased wealth of the gay community helped to promote a diversity of undergarment choices. In his book The Philosophy of Andy Warhol (1975), Andy Warhol wrote:

I told B I needed some socks too and at least 30 pairs of Jockey shorts. He suggested I switch to Italian-style briefs, the ones with the T-shaped crotch that tends to build you up. I told him I'd tried them once, in Rome, the day I was walking through a Liz Taylor movie – and I didn't like them because they made me too self-aware. It gave me the feeling girls must have when they wear uplift bras.

Warhol liked his Jockey briefs so much that he used a pair as a canvas for one of his dollar-sign paintings.

In the UK in the 1970s, tight jeans gave briefs a continued edge over boxer shorts among young men, but a decade later boxers were given a boost by Nick Kamen's performance in Levi's "Laundrette" TV commercial for its 501 jeans, during which he stripped down to a pair of white boxers in a public laundromat. Briefs however remained popular in America amongst young men from the 1950s until the mid-1990s.

The tank top, an undershirt named after the type of swimwear dating from the 1920s known as a tank suit or maillot, became popular warm-weather casual outerwear in the US in the 1980s. Performers including Madonna and Cyndi Lauper were also often seen wearing undergarments on top of outer clothes.

Although worn for decades by exotic dancers, in the 1980s the G-string first gained popularity in South America, particularly in Brazil. Originally a style of swimsuit, the back of the garment is so narrow that it disappears between the buttocks. By the 1990s the design had made its way to most of the Western world, and thong underwear became popular. Today, the thong is one of the fastest-selling styles of underwear among women, and is also worn by men.

The 1990s saw the introduction of boxer briefs, which take the longer shape of boxer shorts but maintain the tightness of briefs. Hip hop stars popularized "sagging", in which loosely fitting pants or shorts were allowed to droop below the waist exposing the waistband or a greater portion of the underpants worn underneath; typically boxer shorts or boxer briefs.

== Trends ==
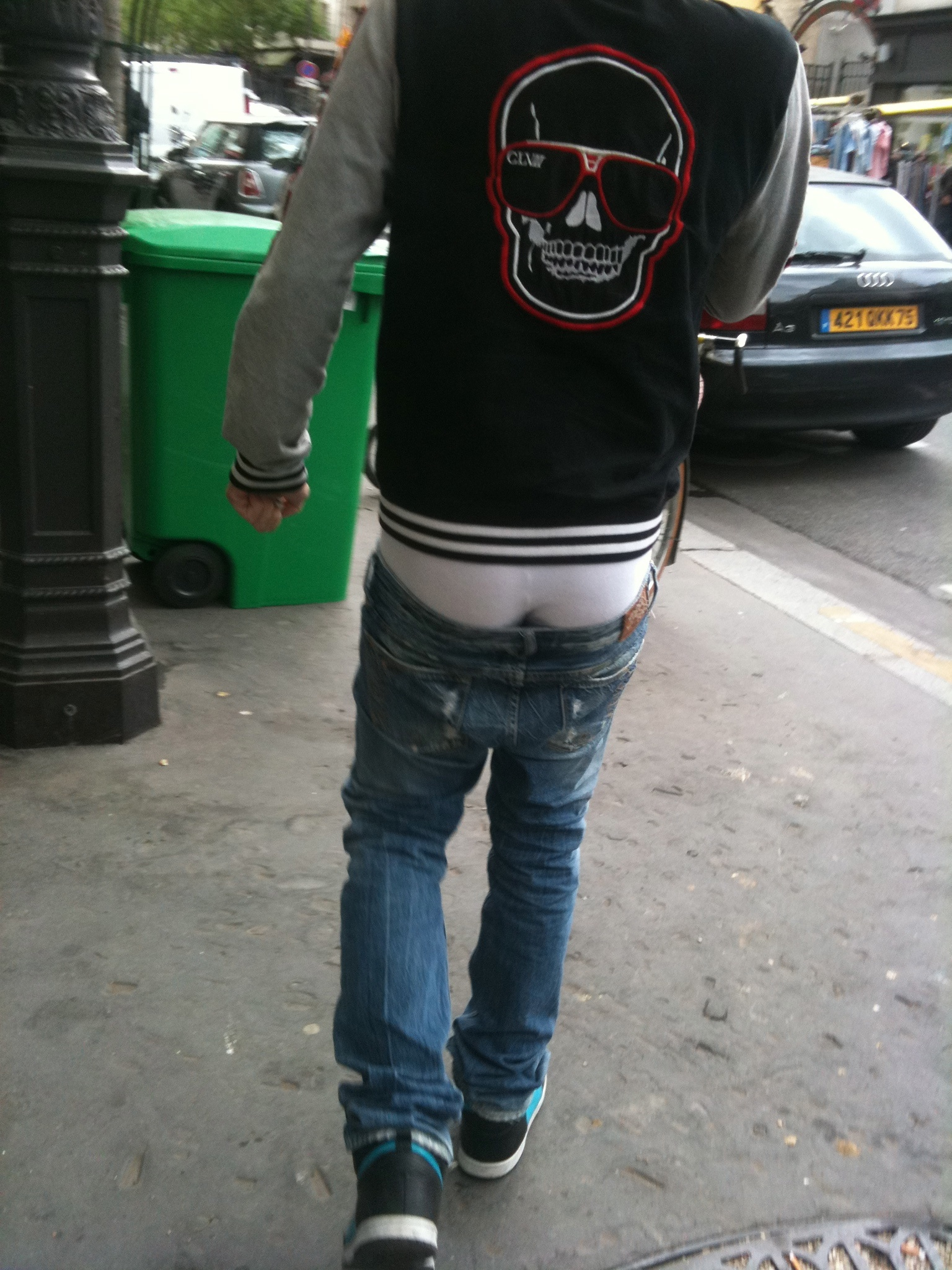
Sagging pants, revealing the wearer's underwear

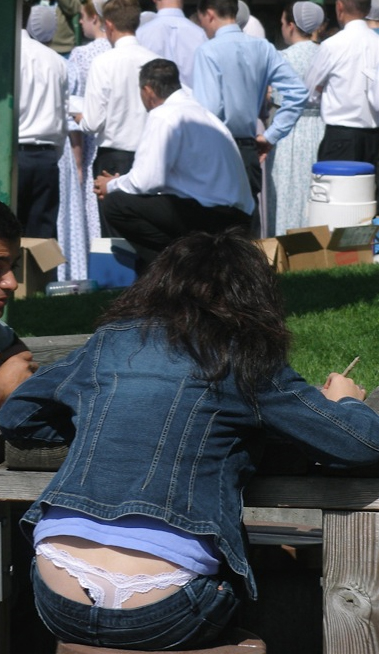
A woman revealing her thong underwear above her pants, displaying a whale tail

Some people choose not to wear any underpants, a practice sometimes referred to as going commando, for comfort, to enable their outer garments (particularly those which are form-fitting) to look more flattering, to avoid creating a panty line, because they find it sexually exciting, to increase ventilation and reduce moisture or because they do not see any need for them. Certain types of clothes, such as cycling shorts and kilts (See True Scotsman), are designed to be worn or are traditionally worn without underpants. This also applies for most clothes worn as nightwear and as swimwear. Some analysts have encouraged people with a higher than average libido to change their underpants more frequently than average due to hygiene-related issues of by-products such as cowper's fluid and vaginal lubrication.

Underwear is sometimes partly exposed for fashion reasons or to titillate. A woman may, for instance, allow the top of her brassiere to be visible from under her collar, or wear a see-through blouse over it. Some men wear T-shirts or A-shirts underneath partly or fully unbuttoned shirts. A common style among young men (2018) is to allow the trousers to sag below the waist, thus revealing the waistband or a greater portion of their underpants. This is commonly referred to (in North America) as "hang-low style". A person wearing low-rise trousers exposing the upper rear portion of their thong underwear is said to display a "whale tail".

=== Used underwear ===
The sale of used female underwear for sexual purposes began in Japan, in stores called burusera, and it was even sold in vending machines. In the 21st century, when the Internet made anonymous mail-order sales possible for individuals, some women in the U.S. and UK, in response to male demand, began selling their dirty panties, and sometimes other underwear. Some men find the odor of a woman's bodily secretions sexually arousing, and will use the dirty panties as a masturbation aid. The sale of dirty panties, sometimes worn for several days, and sometimes customized with requested stains, is a significant niche in the sex work field. A far smaller market sells used male underwear to gay men.

Celebrity underwear is sometimes sold. A framed pair of Elvis Presley's dirty underwear sold for $8,000 in 2012. Undergarments of Marilyn Monroe, Queen Elizabeth, and former Austrian Emperor Franz Joseph have been sold at auction. The celebrities Jarvis Cocker, Alison Goldfrapp, Nick Cave, Sacha Baron Cohen, Ricky Gervais, Jah Wobble, Fergie, and Helen Mirren donated underwear to be sold for charity.

== Types and styles ==
Common contemporary types and styles of undergarments are listed in the table below.

Type	Other Names	Notes	Varieties
Worn by both sexes
Whole body
Long underwear	thermal underwear, long johns	A two-piece undergarment worn during cold weather consisting of a shirt with sleeves extending to the wrists and pants with legs reaching down to the ankles.	
Upper body
T-shirt	tee	A garment covering a person's torso which is usually made without buttons, pockets, or a collar, and can have short or long sleeves. It is worn by pulling it over the head. It is often worn as an outer garment, especially in informal situations.	round-neck T-shirt; V-neck T-shirt
Sleeveless shirt	tank top, wifebeater (slang), singlet, muscle shirt, athletic shirt, A-shirt	A sleeveless garment similar to a T-shirt. Also sometimes worn as an informal outer garment.	A-shirt (guinea tee, muscle shirt, singlet; UK: vest) – tight-fitting with large armholes and a neckline that can extend as far as mid-chest.; camisole: a sleeveless undershirt for women
Lower body
Bikini briefs	bikini Australia: briefs (men's)	Usually worn with the waistband lower than the wearer's true waist, and often at the hips, with the leg bands ending at the groin. Men's bikini briefs normally have no fly.	High-sided bikini briefs; Low-sided bikini briefs; String bikinis – consists of two triangular pieces connected at the groin but not at the sides, with a thin "string" around the waist connecting the pieces.
Thong		Has a narrow strip of material along the centre of the garment's rear which sits between the wearer's buttocks and connects the front or pouch to the waistband behind the wearer. Thongs are sometimes worn to reduce "panty lines" when wearing tightly fitting trousers.	
G-string	Gee-string, G string	A type of thong consisting of a narrow piece of material that covers or holds the genitals, passes between the buttocks, and is attached to a string around the hips.	
C-String	Cee-string, C string	A type of thong which is as narrow as a G-string, but without the supporting "string" around the wearer's hips/panty line, leaving just a sideways C-shaped piece between the legs.	
Tanga	Cheeky	A type of thong which is wider than a G-string and fairly wide in the front, more like the wide V of a traditional brief. Fit tends to be more comfortable than that of a plain thong or G-string and is often more embellished.	
T-front		Has a narrow piece of cloth passing between the buttocks and the labia and only widening above the clitoris. It provides no coverage while still maintaining the basic hygienic underwear functions.	
Worn by women
Upper body
Bra		Usually consists of two cups for the breasts, a centre panel (gore), a band running around the torso under the bust, and a shoulder strap for each side.	Balconette bra; Demi bra; Padded bra; Push-up bra; Sports bra; Strapless bra; T-shirt bra; Wonderbra; Bralette
Lower body
Boy shorts	booty shorts, boyleg briefs, boy short panties, boys' cut shorts, boyshorts, hipsters, shorties	A type of panties with sides that extend lower down the hips, similar to men's trunk briefs.	
Tap pants	side-cut shorts, dance shorts, French knickers	A form of lingerie that covers the pelvic area and the upper part of the upper legs.	
Briefs	classic briefs	These usually have an elastic waistband, a crotch to cover the genital area which is usually lined with absorbent material such as cotton, and a pair of leg openings which are often also elasticized, and have no leg sections.	Control panties – usually made of stretchable material such as Spandex and extending above the waist, these are designed to provide support and create a slimmer appearance.; High cut (French cut) panties.; Hipster – worn lower with the waistband around the hips.
Worn by men
Lower body
Boxer briefs	tight boxers UK: trunks	These are similar in style to boxer shorts, but are form-fitting like briefs.	Athletic-style boxer briefs – similar to bike shorts, these are skin-tight and usually have no fly.; Pouch boxer briefs – these have a pouch for the genitals instead of a fly.
Trunks	trunk briefs, short-leg boxer briefs	These are similar in style to boxer briefs, but shorter in the inseam.	Pouch trunks – these have a pouch for the genitals
Midway briefs	midways, long-leg boxer briefs	These are similar in style to boxer briefs, while being longer in the legs, to near or up to the knees.	Gym midway briefs – skin-tight and usually have no fly; Pouch midway briefs – these have a pouch for the genitals
Boxer shorts	boxers UK: trunks	These have an elasticized waistband that is at or near the wearer's waist, while the leg sections are fairly loose and extend to the mid-thigh. There is usually a fly, either with or without buttons. Boxer shorts with colorful patterns, pictures of cartoon characters, sports team logos, and slogans are readily available.	Knit boxers; Woven boxers
Briefs	classic briefs UK: Y-fronts US: tighty-whiteys (slang), jockey shorts, jockeys Australia: jocks (slang)	These have an elasticized waistband at or near the wearer's waist, and leg bands that end at or near the groin.	Traditional briefs – these have an inverted Y-shaped fly.; Diagonal-flap briefs.; Mid-rise briefs; Low-cut or low-rise briefs; Pouch briefs.
Jockstrap	athletic supporter, jock, nut cup (slang), strap, supporter	Consists of an elastic waistband with a support pouch for the genitalia and two elastic straps affixed to the base of the pouch and to the left and right sides of the waistband at the hip. In some varieties, the pouch may be fitted with a pocket to hold an impact-resistant cup to protect the genitals from injury. A jockstrap is different from a dance belt that a male dancer wears.	Strapless pouch – consists of a support pouch for the genitals and a waistband, with no securing straps.
Religious Under Clothing
Whole body
Temple garments		This kind of underwear is worn by Mormons.	
Upper body
Tallit katan		worn by Jewish men and boys	
Lower body
Kacchera		Worn by Sikhs	

== Industry ==
=== Market ===
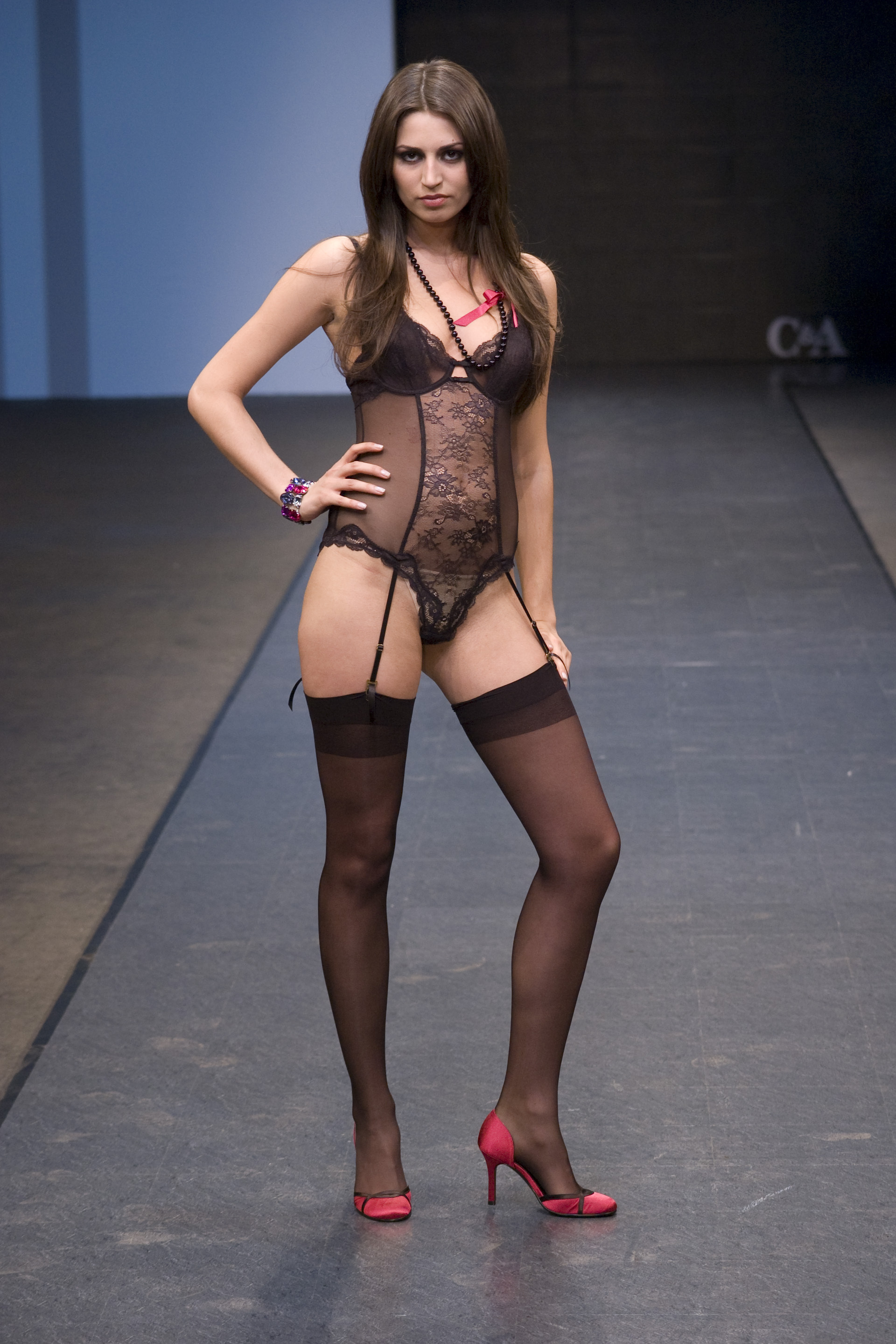
A model showcases a bodysuit having integrated bra and panty, along with stockings

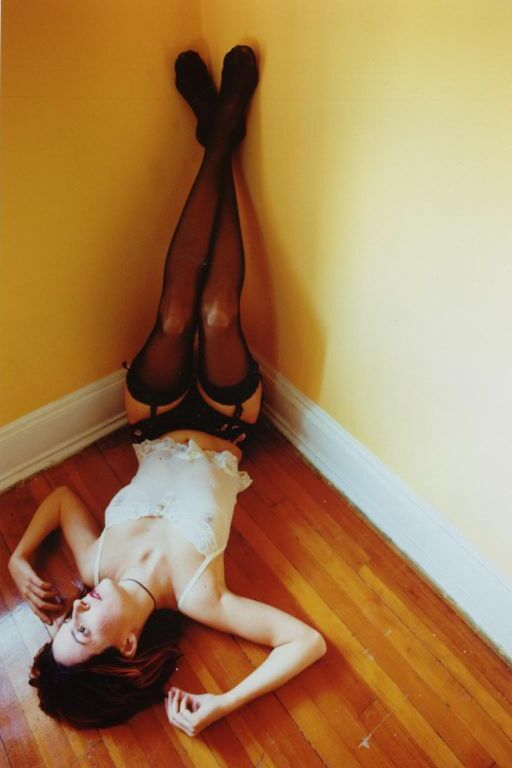
A woman in a camisole, garters, and stockings

In January 2008 it was reported that, according to market research firm Mintel, the men's underwear market in the UK was worth £674 million, and volume sales of men's underpants rose by 24% between 2000 and 2005. British manufacturers and retailers claim that most British men prefer "trunks", or short boxer briefs. The director of menswear of major British retailer Marks & Spencer (M&S), which sells 40 million pairs of men's underpants a year, was quoted as saying that while boxer shorts were still the most popular at M&S, demand was easing off in favor of hipster trunks similar in design to the swimming trunks worn by actor Daniel Craig in the James Bond film Casino Royale (2006).

In 1985, Fruit of the Loom, Hanes, and Jockey International had the largest shares of the U.S. men's underwear market; these companies had about 35%, 15%, and 10% of the market, respectively.

Gregory Woods, author of "We're Here, We're Queer and We're not Going Catalogue Shopping", stated that companies often do not market men's underwear to straight men on the assumption that they are not interested in buying underwear for themselves; therefore many such advertisements are aimed at women to convince them to buy underwear for their husbands, as well as to gay or bisexual men. In 1985 Jockey International president Howard Cooley stated that women often shop more than men do, and men request women to buy underwear for them. According to multiple studies conducted c. 1985, 60-80% of men's undergarments for sale had been purchased by women.

=== Designers and retailers ===
A number of major designer labels are renowned for their underwear collections, including Calvin Klein, Dolce & Gabbana, and La Perla. Likewise, specialist underwear brands are constantly emerging, such as Andrew Christian and 2(x)ist.

Specialist retailers of underwear include high street stores La Senza (Canada), Agent Provocateur and Lounge (company) (UK), Victoria's Secret (U.S.), and GapBody, the lingerie division of the Gap established in 1998 (U.S.). In 2000, the online retailer, Freshpair, started in New York and in 2008 Abercrombie & Fitch opened a new chain of stores, Gilly Hicks, to compete with other underwear retailers.

The 2014 Stockholm Skateathon was sponsored by Björn Borg and the advertising campaign encouraged participants either skateboarding or longboarding, for example, to wear undergarments, and whilst it received criticism by the skateboarders, some people ended up dressing in the undergarments

== Not wearing lower torso undergarments ==
Going without lower body undergarments has come to be known by the slang term going commando, as well as sometimes free-balling or free-buffing (referencing the scrotum and the vulva respectively).

The origins of the phrase go commando are uncertain, with some speculating that it may refer to being "out in the open" or "ready for action". The modern usage may be traced in the United States to university students circa 1974, where it was perhaps associated with soldiers in the Vietnam War, who were reputed to go without underwear to "increase ventilation and reduce moisture". The phrase was in use in the UK before then, referring mainly to women, from the late 1960s. The connection to the UK and women has been suggested to link to a World War II euphemism for prostitutes working in London's West End, who were termed "Piccadilly Commandos". The term was re-popularized in the US after it appeared in a 1996 episode of Friends, where Joey Tribbiani wears everything Chandler Bing owns in an act of revenge, while also going "commando".

In a 2014 open-access internet-based poll, 60 Minutes and Vanity Fair asked visitors to their websites the question "How often do you 'go commando'?" A quarter of participants said that they did this at least occasionally, while 39% said they never did so, and 35% said that they did not know the meaning of the term.

== See also ==
- Corset controversy
- Diaper
- Hosiery
- Ring, slide and hook
- Social aspects of clothing
- Swimsuit
- Trousers § Law – laws on underwear exposure
- Underwear as outerwear
- Underwear Museum – a museum in Lessines, Belgium, and previously in Brussels, displaying undergarments of famous persons
- Men's underwear index – an economic index
