= Braies =

Type of trousers worn by Celtic and Germanic tribes in antiquity

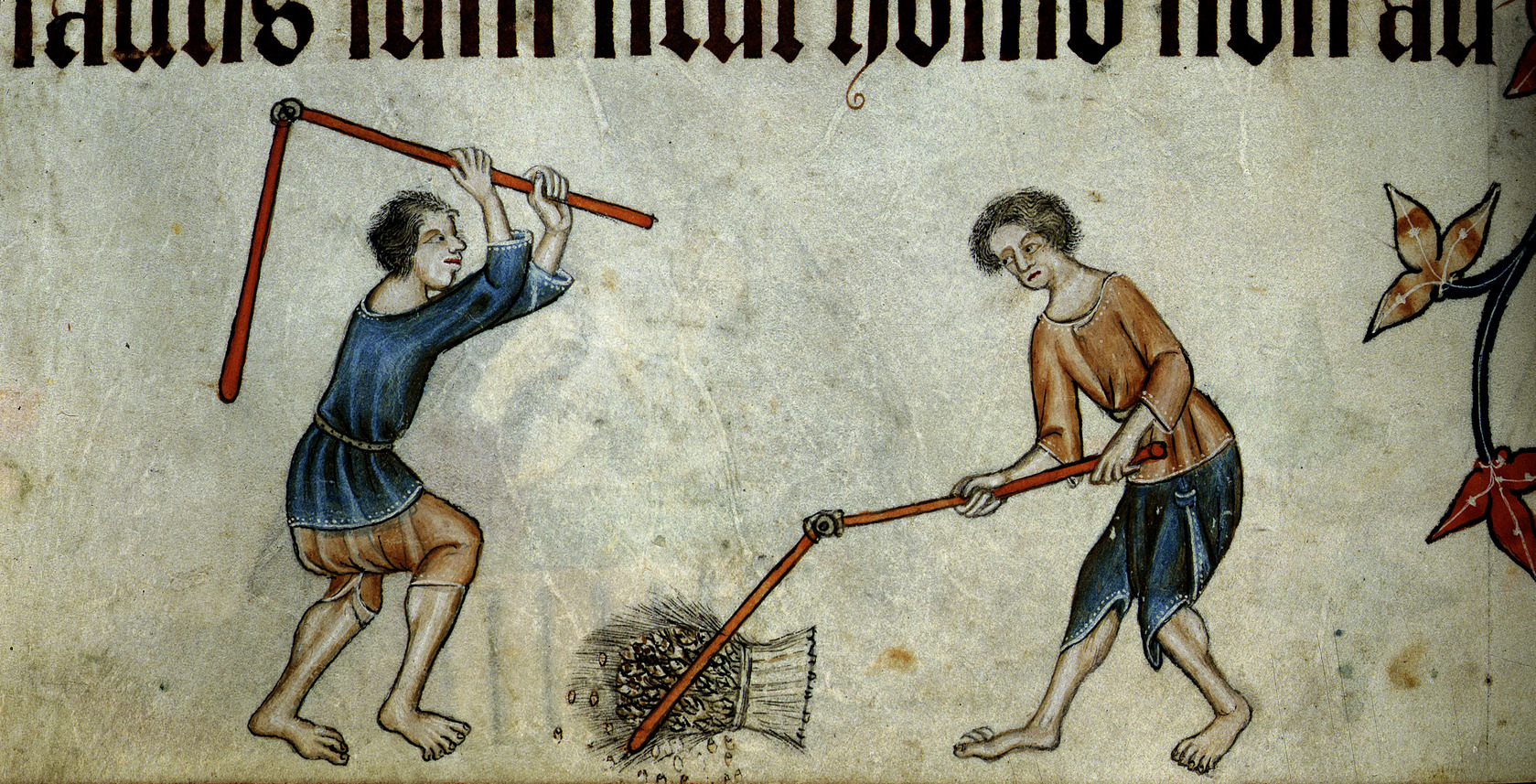
Threshing sheaf of two men, these are wearing a baggy medieval Braies – Luttrell Psalter (c. 1325–1335)

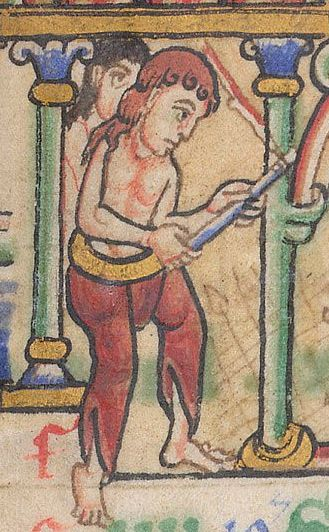
Psalter (the 'Shaftesbury Psalter') with calendar and prayers, England (2nd quarter of the 12th century)

Braies are a type of trouser worn by Celtic and Germanic tribes in antiquity and by Europeans subsequently into the Middle Ages. In the Late Middle Ages, they were used exclusively as undergarments. Braies generally hung to the knees or mid-calf, resembling what are today called shorts. They were made of leather, wool, or, in later years, cotton or linen. They were adopted by the Romans as braccae. By the 11th century, Braies were ankle-length pants held in place by a cord fitted through the top. People from the upper classes wore more fitting braies. while people of the lower classes typically wore loose braies.

== Etymology ==
Braies stems from Old French: braies, but is etymologically related to many other European words for pants, including the English word breeches. Braies via Old French originate from Latin: bracae, plural of braca (also spelled braccae), referring to the shapeless pants worn by the Ancient Gauls, which in turn is borrowed from Gaulish brāca, of Germanic origin. Etymologically akin to Old Norse: brók (such as in the nickname Ragnar Lodbrok, "Ragnar Shaggy-braies"), Old English: brōk or brōc (plural: brēc), German: Bruch, Danish: brog, Swedish: brok, etc.
