= Swim trunks =

Short trousers or swimwear

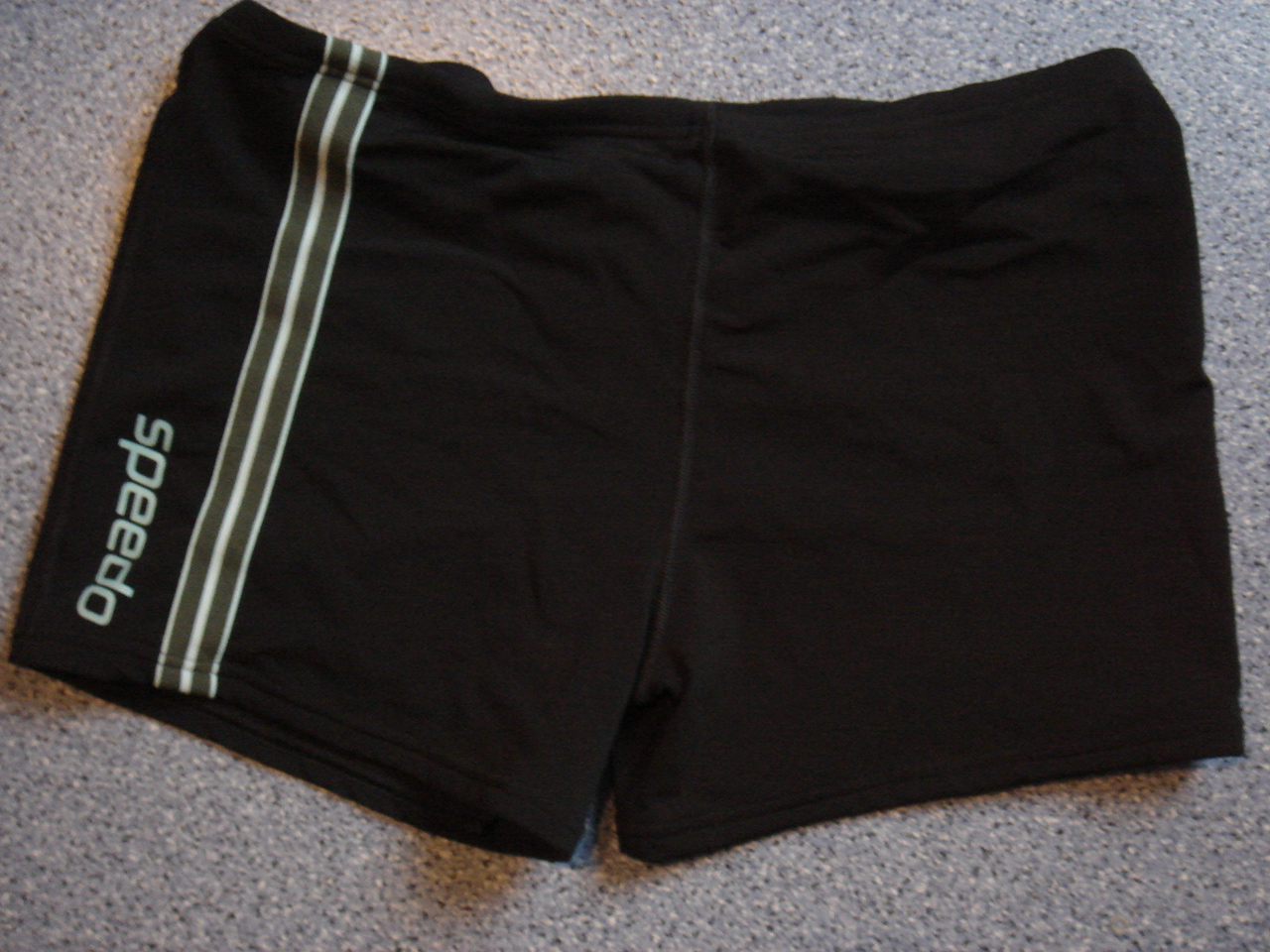
Trunks

Swim trunks, also known as swimming trunks, are a form of swimsuit worn by men and boys specifically for swimming. As such, they are typically made of materials designed for being wet and remaining comfortable and hydrodynamic to not impede the swimmer. The choice of materials makes them distinct from underwear which may have a similar shape. The term is a catch-all for a number of styles of garment such as briefs (very short with no leg coverage), shorts (fabric extends beyond the crotch and slightly onto the legs) and "jammers" (extend further down the legs, to mid thigh or even the knee, and popular with competitive swimmers).

Especially in North America, the term swim trunks can include water-friendly variants of articles like beach shorts and boardshorts which are typically baggy, casual, and more modest, but also impede the performance of the swimmer.

== Other usage ==
Other items of clothing can also be known as trunks, such as looser-fitting garments used for boxing and track and field events, and certain styles of underpants (especially in British English).

In American English, the term is sometimes used to refer to trunk hose, defined by the Collins American English Dictionary as "full, baggy breeches reaching about halfway down the thigh, worn in the 16th and 17th cent." More recently, “trunks” has been used as shorthand for the trunk briefs, a shorter version of boxer briefs.
