= Underpants =

Underwear worn on the lower body

Underpants are underwear worn on the lower body generally extending no higher than the navel. In British English, they are often known as simply pants. If a given pair of underpants has a wider waistband, it might bear the brand name of the manufacturer on it.

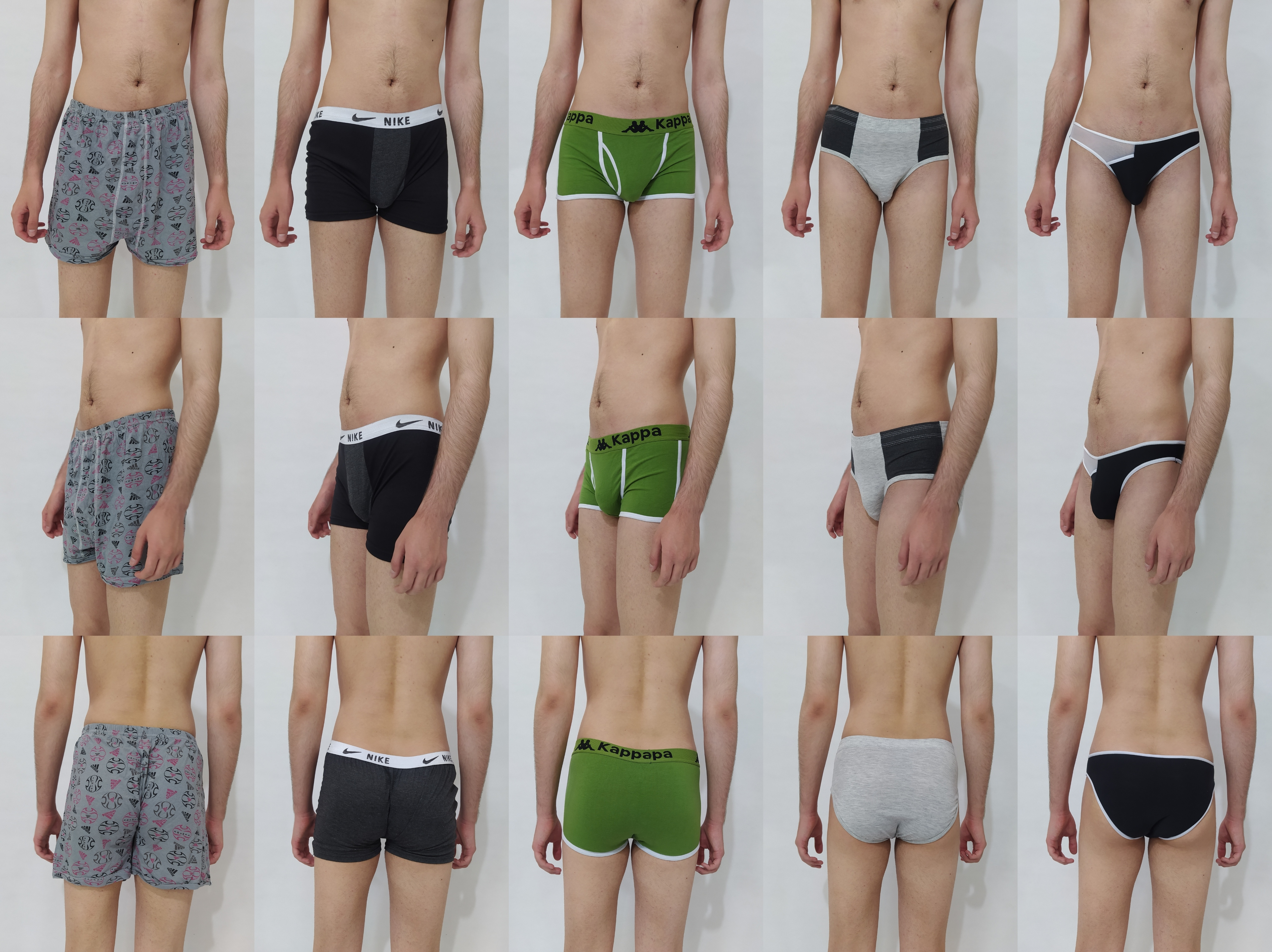
Five styles of men's underpants: boxer shorts, trunks, punt trunks, briefs, and bikini briefs

== Types of underpants ==
Gender	Type	Example	Description
Unisex	Long underpants	A male wearing long underwear	Long underpants are the bottom half of a style of two-piece underwear called long underwear, long johns, or thermal underwear, that has long legs and long sleeves, and is normally worn during cold weather; also commonly worn by people under their clothes in cold countries. The male version of a long underwear bottom may or may not have a front fly.
Unisex	Briefs	Male briefs	Classic briefs have an elasticated waistband at or near the wearer's waist, and leg bands that end at or near the groin. Many male briefs feature a fly. They are known as Y-fronts in Britain.
Unisex	Bikini briefs	Male bikini briefs	Bikini briefs are a variation on classic briefs that have less coverage; but typically have full coverage of the buttocks. Conventionally, the men's version has no fly.
Unisex	Thong	Male thong	Thongs are like bikini briefs, except the backside is very narrow and goes between the buttocks.
Unisex	Open drawers		Open drawers are undergarments where the backs and front of the legs are not joined.
Unisex	Diapers		Diapers (North America) or nappies (Britain, Ireland, and Australia) are a type of underwear worn by young children and those suffering from incontinence. Unlike other briefs, diapers allow the wearer to urinate or defecate without soiling their surroundings. These can be either reusable or disposable.
Male	Boxer shorts	Boxer shorts	Boxer shorts, boxers, or trunks (Britain), have an elasticated waistband that is at or near the wearer's waist, while the leg sections are fairly loose and extend to the mid-thigh. There is usually a fly, either with or without buttons.
Male	Midway briefs	Midway briefs	Midway briefs are similar in style to boxer briefs, but are longer in the leg, at the longest being down to the knees.
Male	Boxer briefs	Boxer briefs	Boxer briefs are similar in style to boxer shorts, but are form-fitting like classic briefs. Like men's briefs, they often utilize a fly. Boxer briefs are called "trunks" in Britain.
Male	Trunk briefs	Trunk briefs	Trunk briefs, also known as simply trunks, are shorter than boxer briefs but still have leg sections, unlike briefs.
Female	Panties	Several styles of women's underpants (thong and G-string: back view)	”Panties” is a general term for female underpants. There are a number of different styles including variations of the unisex types. Panties are known as "knickers" in Britain.

== See also ==
- Leggings
- Sagging
- True Scotsman
- Underwear as outerwear
