= Waistband =

Clothing component that encircles the waist, especially of a skirt or trousers

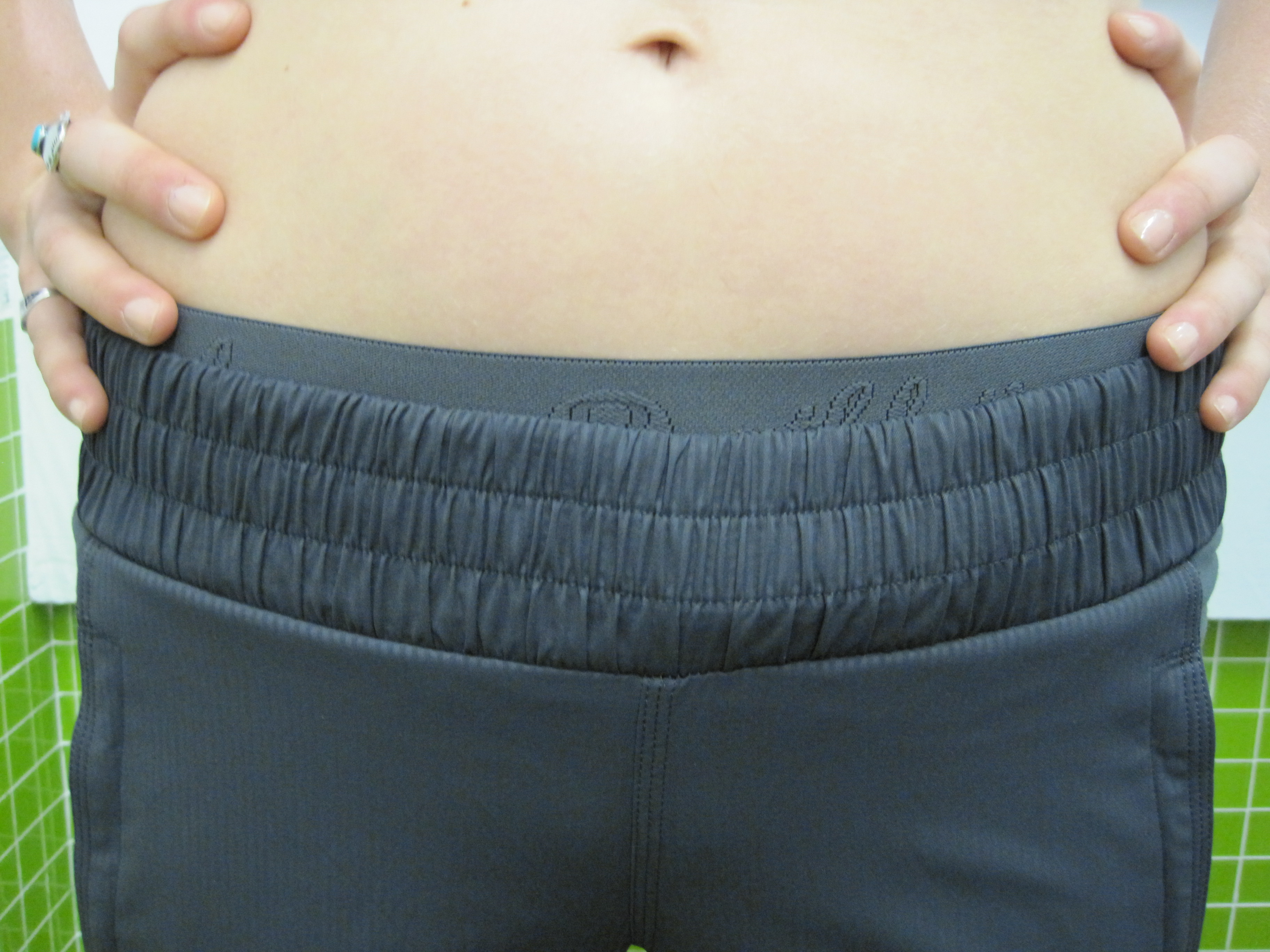
A waistband

A waistband is a strip of material that is either elastic or some other confining fabric that encircles the waist, usually as a component of clothing such as skirts, trousers, shorts, swimsuits, and undergarments.

A waistband can be a complete undergarment, worn to limit expansion of the abdomen, to meet various objectives including to help prevent overeating, to encourage mindful eating, to encourage good posture, or to immediately slim the appearance of the waist (much like a corset, also sometimes called a waist cincher, or girdle).

A waistband can be an outer garment, worn for fashion, or for utility.

== History ==
Historically, in northern India, waistbands served various purposes including fastening miscellaneous items to oneself, such as knives. In ancient history in the southern Levant, the waistband could serve as a status symbol when people would adorn themselves with ornaments attached to their waistbands. In the early 19th century, members of some Taoist branches had their waistbands colored as a distinguisher and in order to symbolize their membership of the sect. In the western world during the 19th century, the contortion of waistbands was less pronounced due to the fashionability of suspenders.

== Material and culture ==
Among some members of the Yoruba, the placement of beads upon their waistbands is an established tradition that is believed to enhance and accentuate a women's femininity. The dimensions of the waistband serve as a contrivance for streamlining waist measurements. Waistbands are often designed with belt loops in order to allow for variation in case of manufacturer subtleties or weight variation in the wearer. A recent Debenhams survey revealed that the placement of one's waistband by males varies with age, with mid-teen boys placing them the lowest, while it steadily rises until the age of 57. The exposure of the underpant waistband has become a trend among followers of grunge music and hip-hop. In stretchy waistbands, the material can be made of various materials including rubber and latex. In contemporary times, waistbands are more picturesque and scintillating compared to previous designs. In western culture waist bands are now often used to achieve body goals such as to prevent overeating in order to maintain a healthy weight.

== Unwanted erections ==
Some men use the waistband in order to hide a genital bulge (also known by the informal terms man-bulge or moose-knuckle) in order to avoid embarrassment. During an erection, this is done by jutting it upwards beneath the waistband. This approach may on occasion be colloquially and informally referred to by slang terms such as a waistband tuck, the waistband trick, the uptuck or the tuck, the "6 to midnight", or the boner tuck. Although such penile concealment is common in many cultures, some analysts have proposed limiting such a sentiment to informal etiquette so it mitigates the possibility of a young male's propensity for genital dysphoria and subsequent gender dysphoria or body dysmorphia.
