= Boxer briefs =

Type of form-fitting underpants for men

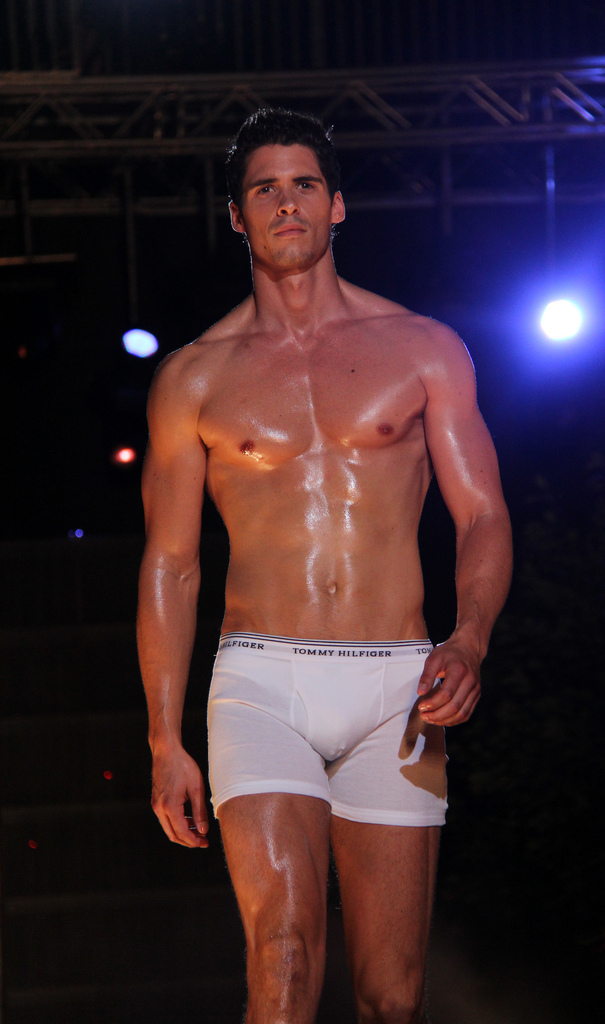
A model wearing boxer briefs.

Boxer briefs (sometimes spelled boxer-briefs or called tight boxers, trunks, also known as A-Fronts) are a hybrid type of men's undergarment which are long in the leg, similar to boxer shorts, but tight-fitting like briefs. They emerged as a style in the 1990s and are commonly worn for sports and as every-day underwear.

== Etymology ==
The term derives from the elasticated shorts worn by participants in the sport of boxing.

Boxer briefs are also called "trunks" in the United Kingdom and Australia - not to be confused with the term referring specifically to the shorter variant of the garment.

== History ==
Boxer briefs were once commonly thought to have been pioneered by designer John Varvatos during his 1990–1995 stint at Calvin Klein as head of menswear design. However, the style was available much earlier, as designed by Giorgio Armani and as worn by Richard Gere in the 1980 film American Gigolo. Made famous by a series of 1992 print ads featuring Mark "Marky Mark" Wahlberg, they have been called "one of the greatest apparel revolutions of the century". Of their creation Varvatos said in 2010, "We just cut off a pair of long johns and thought, this could be cool..."

== Design ==
The boxer brief design provides coverage for the midsection from the waist to the thighs. They are usually made of a combination of cotton and spandex, polyester, or a soft, woven flannel material. Boxer brief designs can have either a keyhole fly, button (snap) front, pouch, or no fly at all. The waistband is usually a separate band of elastic material, often in a contrasting color to the main material. The elastic band often has the name of the manufacturer printed on it. There may also be additional elastic sewn around the bottom end of the thigh portion of the garment. Some boxer briefs have stitching on the rear to outline the buttocks and avoid a central seam. Boxer briefs are commonly used in athletics instead of, or in addition to, a jockstrap, but are common for everyday use as well. A variant that reaches to the knee or near it is marketed by Jockey as "midway briefs", and is also sold by other companies. Another variant are boxer briefs that have shorter leg sections than the standard type, called "trunk briefs" or "trunks".

== Possible effect on male fertility ==
Some studies have suggested that tight underpants like boxer briefs and high temperature are not optimally conductive for sperm production. The testicles are outside the body for cooling because they operate for sperm production at a slightly lower temperature than the rest of the body, and boxer shorts allow the testicles to operate within the required temperature range. The compression of the genitals in boxer briefs, briefs, thongs, etc. may cause the temperature to rise and sperm production to fall. There is a similar theory regarding testicular cancer risk. Other sources dispute this theory. A study in the October 1998 Journal of Urology, for example, concluded that underwear type is unlikely to have a significant effect on male fertility.

== Image gallery ==
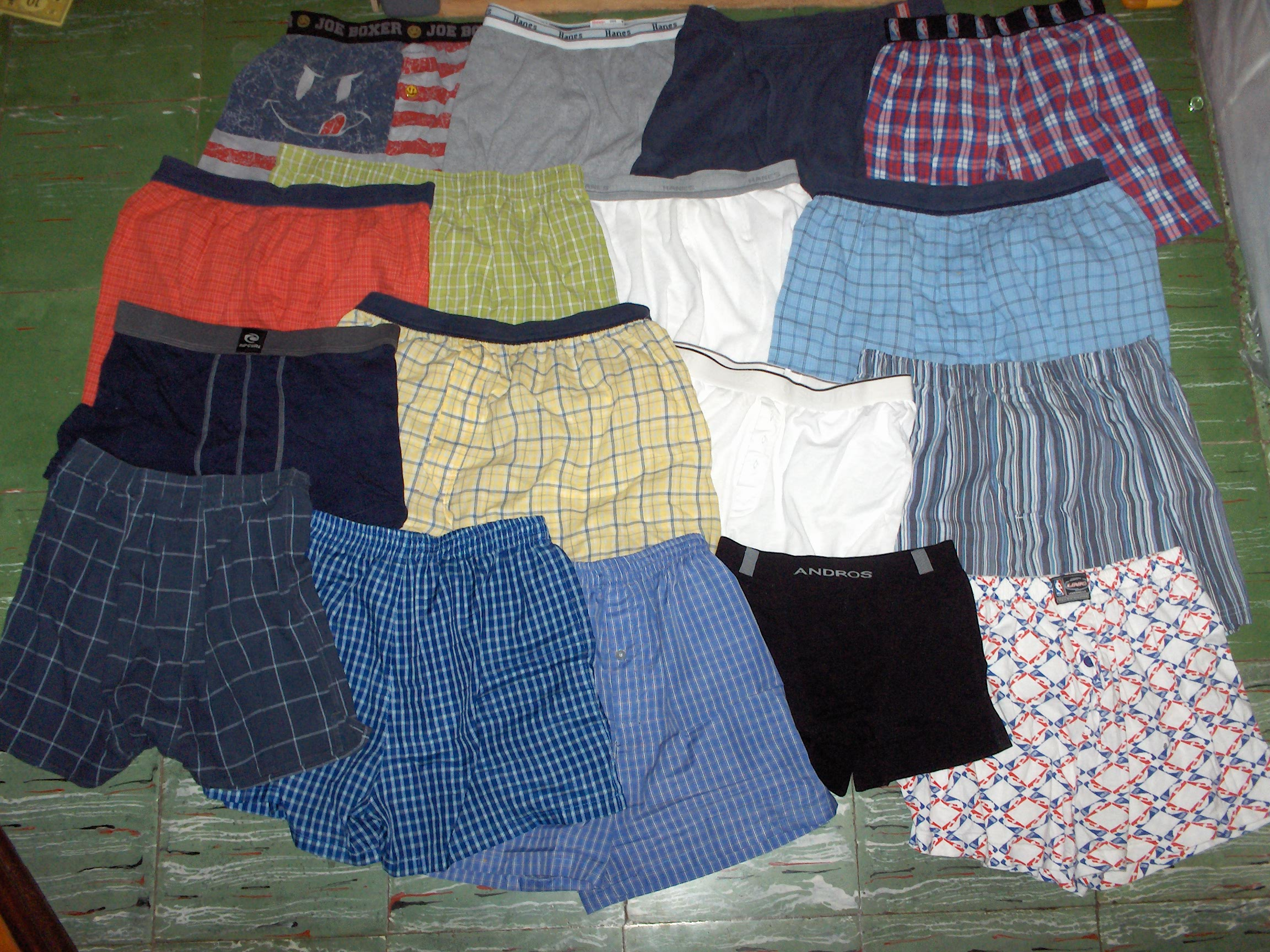
Several pairs of boxer briefs compared with loose boxer shorts.

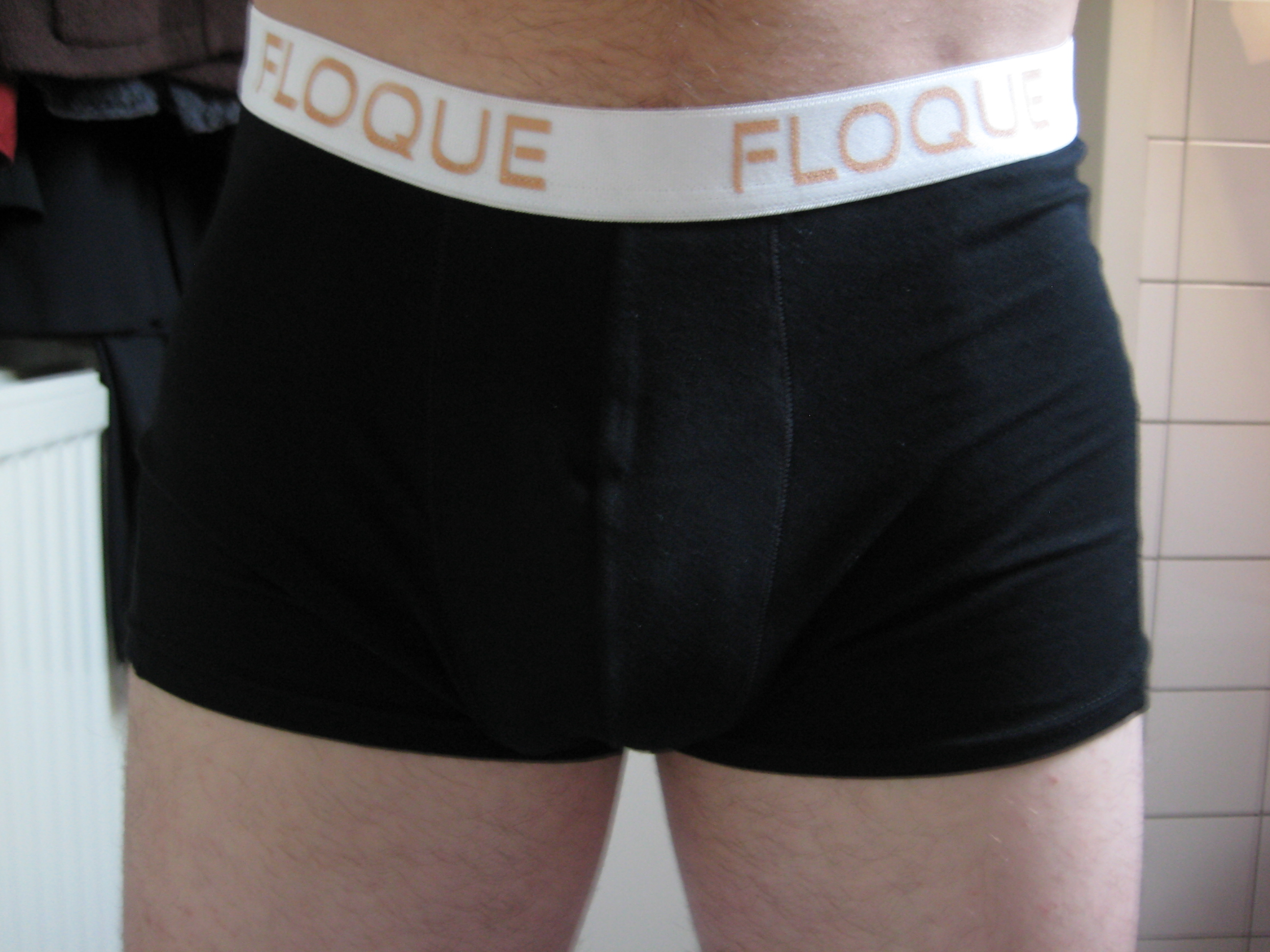
A man wearing a pair of short-leg boxer briefs.

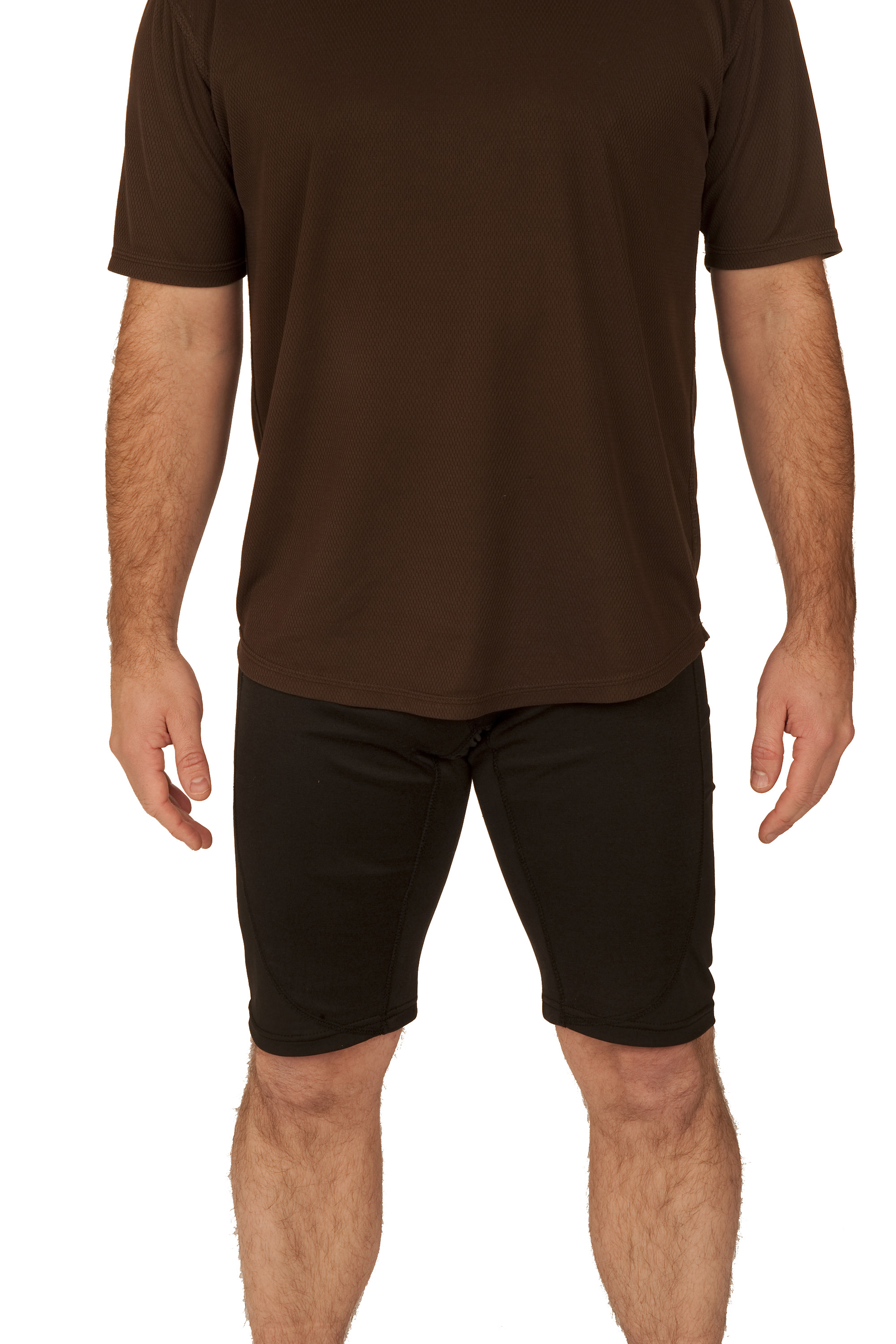
A man wearing long-leg boxer briefs.

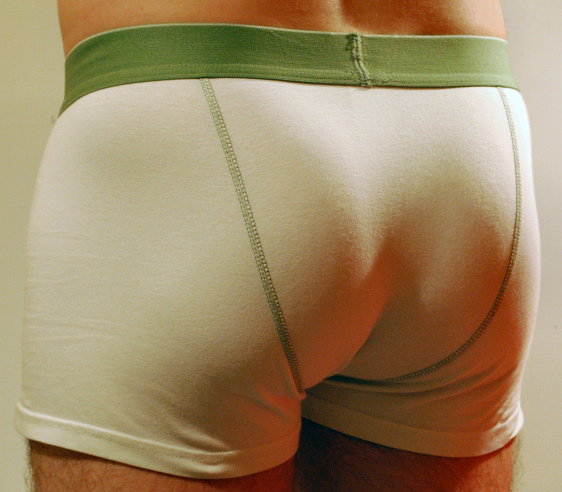
Rear stitching on these boxer briefs avoids a central seam and outlines the buttocks.
