= Braccae =

Trousers worn by the Gauls

Braccae (or bracae) is the Latin term for "trousers", and in this context is today used to refer to a style of trousers made from wool. According to the Romans, this style of clothing originated from the Gauls.

Braccae were typically made with a drawstring, and tended to reach from just above the knee at the shortest, to the ankles at the longest, with length generally increasing in tribes living further north.

For the Romans, to encircle the legs and thighs with fasciae, or bands, was understood, in the time of Pompey and Horace, to be a proof of ill health and effeminacy. Roman men typically wore tunics, which were one-piece outfits terminating at or above the knee.

== Etymology ==
The word originates from the Gaulish bhrāg-ikā, after going through a process of syncopation it gave rise to braca "trouser, pants".

The word is cognate with the English breeches. It appears to derive from the Indo-European root *bhrg- "break", here apparently used in the sense "divide", "separate", as in Scottish Gaelic briogais ("trousers"), in Breton bragoù ("pants"), in Irish bríste ("trousers"), brycan/brogau in Welsh and in Dutch broek ("trousers"). The Celtic form may have first passed to the Etruscan language, which did not distinguish between the [k] and [ɡ] sounds.

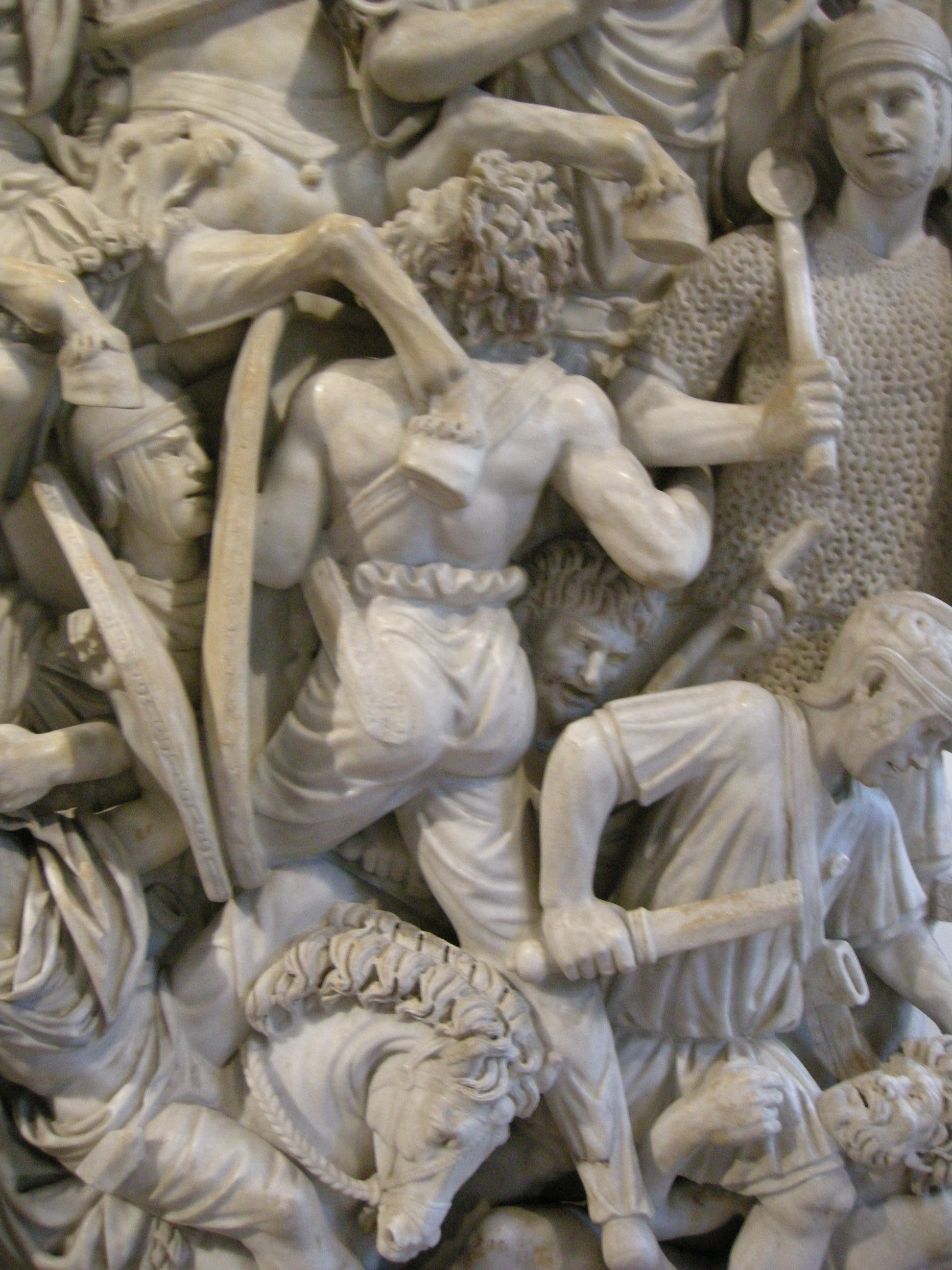
Bare-backed Goth warrior on the Ludovisi Battle sarcophagus wearing braccae, baggy knickerbockers, first used by the Celts and then extended to the other barbarian tribes.

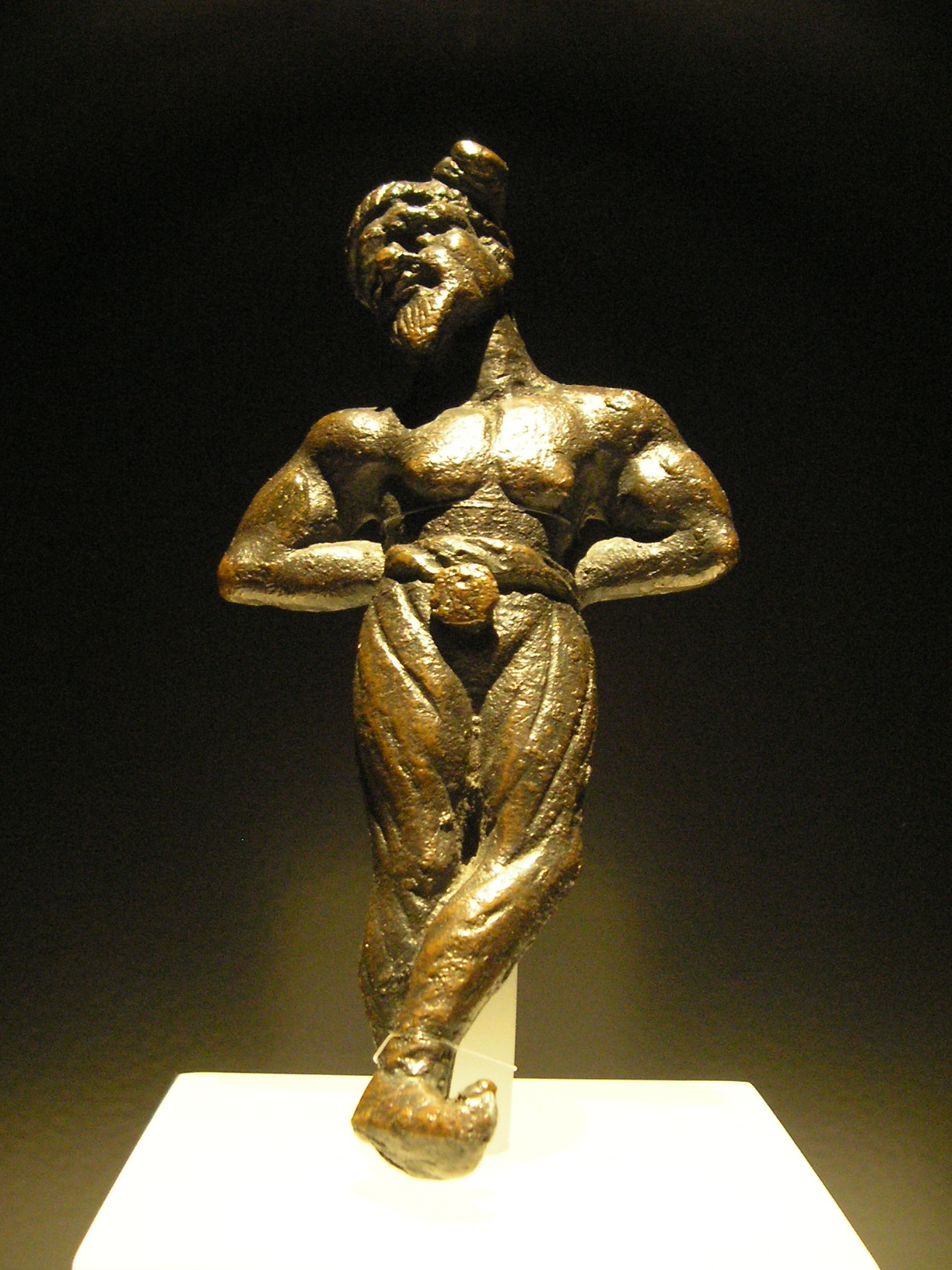
Chained Germanic tribesman, 2nd century A.D. Bronze. The prisoner wears braccae that were typical for the Germanic tribes. His hair is tied in a Suebian knot.

== Bibliography ==
- Collis, John (2003). The Celts: Origins, Myths, Inventions, Tempus. ISBN 0-7524-2913-2.
- Dodge, Hazel; Peter Connolly (1998). Die antike Stadt. Ein Leben in Athen und Rom. ISBN 978-3829011044. Cologne: Konemann Verlagsgesellschaft.
- Mau, August (1893). "Ἀναξυρίδες". In: Paulys Realencyclopädie der classischen Altertumswissenschaft (RE). Vol. I, 2, Stuttgart, p. 2100 f.
- Oppenheimer, Stephen (2006). The Origins of the British. Constable & Robinson.
- Wells, Peter S. (2001). Beyond Celts, Germans and Scythians, Duckworth Debates in Archaeology. ISBN 0-7156-3036-9.
- Yates, James (1875). "Bracae". In: William Smith: A Dictionary of Greek and Roman Antiquities. London: John Murray. p. 213.
