= French knickers =

Women's underwear garment

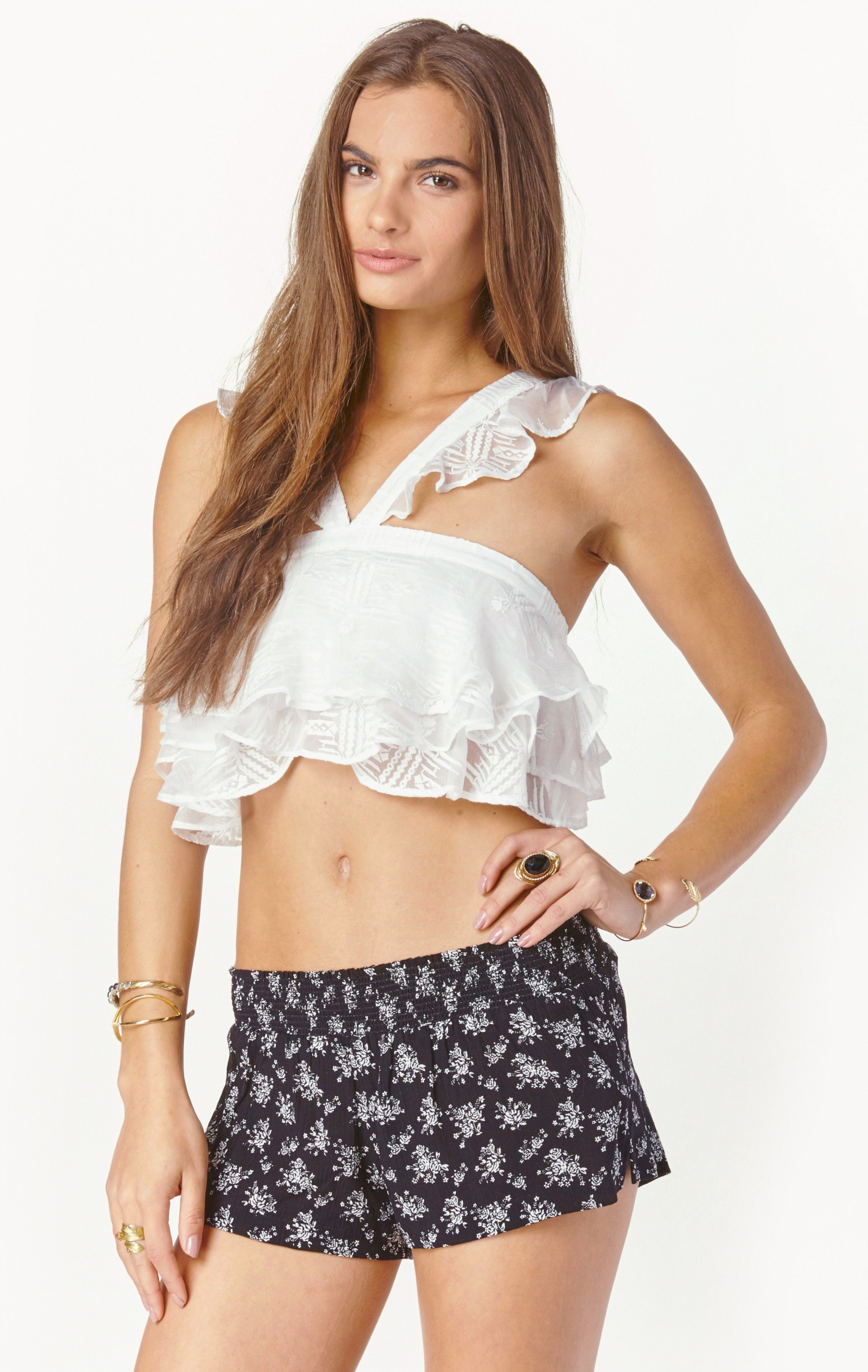
A woman wearing French knickers and a frilly white crop top

French knickers (also known as tap pants in the United States) are a type of women's underwear or lingerie. The term is predominantly used in the United Kingdom and Australia to describe loose-fitting underpants resembling shorts. French knickers sit at the hips, covering the upper thigh and fully concealing the buttocks. They feature an 'open leg' design, meaning the leg openings are loose rather than elasticated, allowing for a more comfortable fit. The straight-cut cuffs may be plain or adorned with decorative trimming, and the fabric is often bias-cut to improve drape and movement.

French knickers are not to be confused with other underpants styles such as hipsters, briefs, bikini bottoms and boyshorts, all of which feature elasticated leg openings and fit snug to the body.

French knickers are ideally accompanied by full, flared, and A-Line skirts, trousers, and dresses, as they can add bulk and produce a visible panty line (VPL). The item is an elegant and comfortable alternative to more fitted forms of underwear and luxury fabrics such as silk are often used in their production.

== History ==
The French knicker style evolved from pantalettes and open drawers, which were loose, long-legged undergarments worn during the Victorian era. The term may have originated from the frilled pantalettes associated with Parisian Can-Can dancers, a style prevalent from the late 19th to early 20th century. However, the term 'French knickers' is not used by the French. During the 1920s and 1930s, French knickers were highly popular. However, by the 1940s and 1950s, briefs—often featuring elasticated waistbands—became the preferred choice for most women, perhaps due to fabric shortages and the scarcity of silk. By the 1950s, fitted underpants were almost universally worn.

During the nostalgia revival of the 1970s, French knickers regained popularity through the designs of Janet Reger and others, particularly appealing to a speciality market in the 1980s. Their popularity declined again in the 1990s as younger consumers gravitated toward other underwear styles, such as briefs and thongs. Today, French knickers remain available, primarily through vintage reproduction brands and speciality retailers.
