= Tap pants =

Form of lingerie

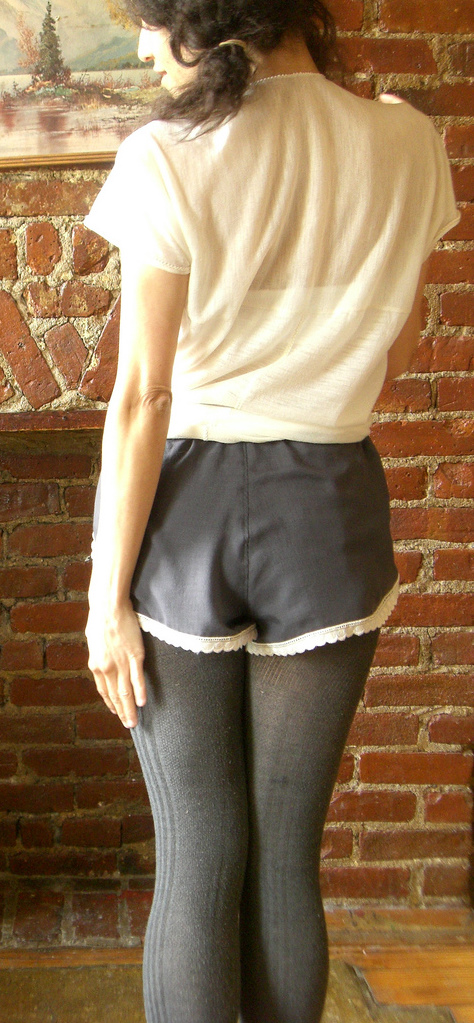
Tap pants (rear view).

Tap pants, also known as side-cut shorts or dance shorts, are a form of lingerie designed for women, similar to French knickers in appearance. As the name implies, they are a type of shorts, in that they cover the pelvic area and the upper part of the upper legs. The name originates from shorts worn by tap dancers during the 1930s while practicing their routines. Tap pants are mostly made of lace, silk, satin, polyester, rayon and cotton voile. Some pairs may be trimmed in ruffles.

Tap pants look much like track shorts, allow freedom of movement, and can be worn as an outer garment over other types of underwear (e.g., g-strings), however they are mostly worn as innerwear or leisure wear. From a distance, tap pants can be mistaken for a half slip.

Tap pants generally hang loose around the body. For this reason, they have been losing popularity to slimmer versions of underwear since the mid 20th century, as loose undergarments do not mix with figure-hugging dresses, and especially with pants. Another garment, similar to tap pants but tighter to the body, are boyshorts or booty shorts. A culotte is similar to tap pants, but longer in the leg.
