= Thongs =

Thongs may refer to:

- Thong, a garment which primarily covers only the pubic area.
- G-string, a variant of the thong garment
- Flip-flops, (Commonly known as thongs in Australia) a type of footwear
- The thin, flexible strand or strands of a whip
