= Panties =

Women's underpants

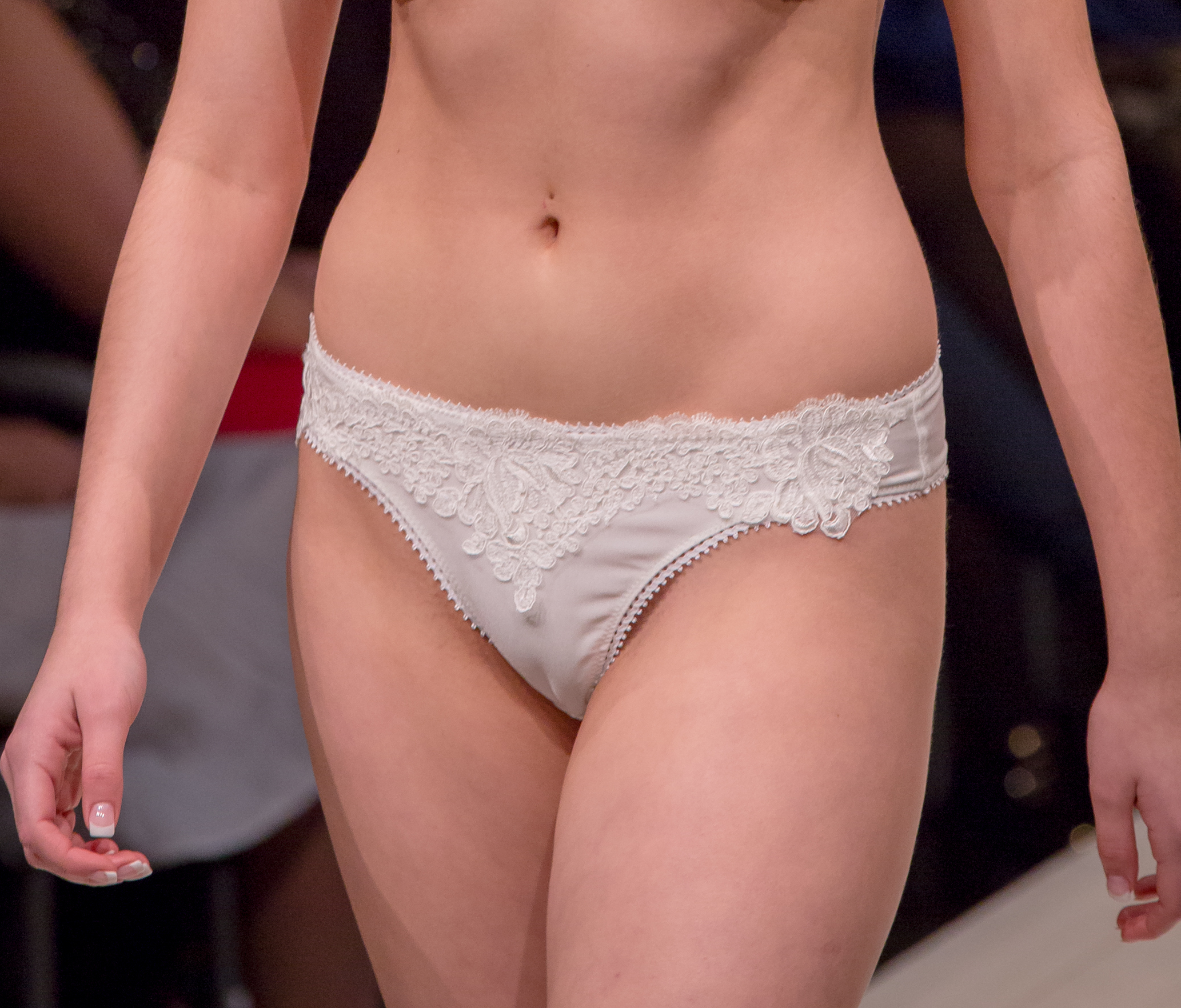
A model in white panties

Various styles of panties (thong and G-string: back view)

Panties are form-fitting underpants primarily worn by women. Typical components include an elastic waistband, a crotch panel to cover the genitalia (usually lined with absorbent material such as cotton), and a pair of leg openings that, like the waistband, are often made of elastomer. Various materials are used, but are usually chosen to be breathable.

Panties are made of a variety of materials, including cotton, lace, latex, leather, mesh, nylon, PVC, polyester, rawhide, satin, silk and spandex. Construction typically consists of two pieces (front and rear) that are joined by seams at the crotch and sides; an additional gusset is often in the crotch, with the waistband and leg-openings made from elastomer.

== Terminology ==
In the United States and Canada, "panties" is a common term used for female underpants.

In the United Kingdom, Ireland, and occasionally in other Commonwealth countries such as Australia, New Zealand, and South Africa, panties may be known as "knickers", "undies", or simply "underwear". The last two of these are gender-neutral terms and can be used for either male or female styles of underpants.

In Australia, underpants are often called "undies", although the word can also refer to panties.

== History ==
Underwear resembling modern day panties were first invented in the 1920s, when long drawers were shortened to be made less cumbersome, although they were heavily decorated and had to be fastened. The bows used for fastening still remain on some panties as a decoration.

Between 1930 and 1947, panties were shortened further and made with cotton instead of linen. By the 1960s, wide-legged panties (or French knickers) were used instead of a slip by most women in the west and were often manufactured in vibrant colors and prints.

In the 1970s, close-fitting panties became more common made in stretch fabrics such as polyester and stretch cotton. In the 1980s, high-leg briefs were popular in the gym as aerobics dance wear worn over tights or as part of a leotard.

In the 1990s, buttocks-exposing panties such as thongs became popular. In some cases the strap of the thong would ride above the low-rise waist of jeans or trousers, matching the fashion trend for exposed bra straps under vest tops with spaghetti straps.

In the 2000s, boyshorts and hipster styles were introduced. However, minis and briefs and other styles continued to be popular. Around this time, innovations in fabric technology introduced seamless styles which allowed people to wear tight-fitting clothes in smooth fabrics without their underwear showing through.

== Styles ==
Panties are classified into various styles based on criteria such as the amount of rear coverage, width at the sides and height at which they are worn. These categories are not necessarily distinct and usage may vary somewhat among brands:

Rear coverage	Type	Example	Description
Minimal (thongs) (Note: Thongs provide a moderate to minimal coverage with back coverage that is less than a bikini, and the waistband is reduced to a narrow strip at the sides.)	Adhesive / C-string	Pink C-string, retained using underwires	Adhesive panties are sometimes described as strapless/stick-on panties. They are a form of micro-panties that cover nothing but the genitalia. They can used for women who prefer not to have a visible panty line, but still want to maintain basic hygiene.
Minimal (thongs)	T-front	White T-front, obscured by trousers.	The T-front is a type of G-string in which the string also reaches the front part. It provides almost no coverage while still maintaining the basic hygienic underwear functions and covering only the genitalia. It is usually made with only strings, sometimes with more fabric or lace around the waist.
Minimal (thongs)	G-string	White G-string, rear view	The G-string has a vertical string at the back, which connects the crotch to the waistband, sometimes featuring a triangle of fabric which is sometimes known as a whale tail when it is shown above the waistband of low riding pants.
Minimal (thongs)	Thong	Rear view of a woman wearing a gray thong.	The thong has a waistband similar to tangas, but the rear coverage is mostly minimal. The crotch is triangle-shaped, as it narrows to a thin strip toward the back and sits between the buttocks, becoming wider towards the top where it connects to the waistband. Like the G-string, if the back fabric appears above the waistband of low riding pants, the result is also called a whale tail.
Moderate	Tanga	Woman wearing a tanga, also known as a Brazilian thong.	Tangas can be considered as an intermediate step between thongs, which have minimal rear coverage, and bikinis, which have moderate to full rear coverage.
Moderate	Bikinis	Two women; one is wearing black conventional bikini underwear and the other is wearing white string bikini underwear.	Bikinis, like hipsters, sit at hip level, but the fabric of the side sections is narrower. With the string bikini type, the side sections disappear altogether and the waistband consists of only string-like material. There may be less rear coverage with the bikini style.
Moderate	Hipsters	Woman wearing black hipster underwear.	Hipsters are a blend between bikinis and boyshorts. They sit on the hips of the wearer and are worn slightly below the navel.
Moderate	Boyshorts	A model in white boyshorts	Boyshorts cover the hips and are named for their similarity to boxer briefs, a variation on boxer shorts. Some resemble men's briefs, complete with fly and contrast trim. Unlike men's briefs, this style is usually lower cut. Boyshorts often cover most of the buttocks.
Moderate	Cheekies	Rachel Starr wearing red cheekies at AVN 2011.	Cheekies can be styled as a hipster, bikini, or boyshort in the front, but in the rear, they are designed to fit close to the buttocks, and have a seam or ruching to make the fabric sit partially between the cheeks to accentuate the shape. They leave the outer half to quarter of each cheek exposed and often have a lace or scalloped trim.
Full (briefs) (Note: Briefs rise to the waist, or just below the navel, and have full coverage in the rear.)	High-cut	Two women wearing "Woxer" brand high-cut briefs and sport bras	High-cut briefs sit higher on the waist, providing more coverage in the midriff region. They are designed with larger leg holes and narrower sides to show off more leg and allow more freedom of movement.
Full (briefs)	Classic	Model dressed in lace-trimmed sheer classic briefs	Classic briefs have the waistband sitting high on the waist. The leg holes are small so the underwear covers as much area between waist and thigh as possible. Sometimes called "granny panties" because they were the standard underpants in previous decades and have a connotation of being worn by older women.
Full (briefs)	Control	White control briefs with lace trim	Control briefs are designed to offer support while giving a slimmer appearance. This type usually contains a stretch material such as spandex and may extend above the waist. Some have an extra firm panel to flatten the abdomen. Some also compress the buttocks, while other control briefs are designed to avoid compression of the buttocks. Others merely lift the buttocks and have holes cut out for maximum fullness of the buttocks.
Full (loose pants)	Tap pants	Two women wearing tap pants	Tap pants are short pants with a short inseam length.
Full (loose pants)	Bloomers		Bloomers are shorts with a variable inseam length and bloused leg holes.

== See also ==
- French knickers
- Leggings
  - Leg warmers
  - Tights
- Lingerie
- No Pants Day
- Pantalettes
- Pantyhose
- Teddy
- Underpants
- Underwear
- Underwear as outerwear
- Underwear fetishism
- Whale tail
