= Dance belt =

Specialized undergarment worn by male ballet dancers

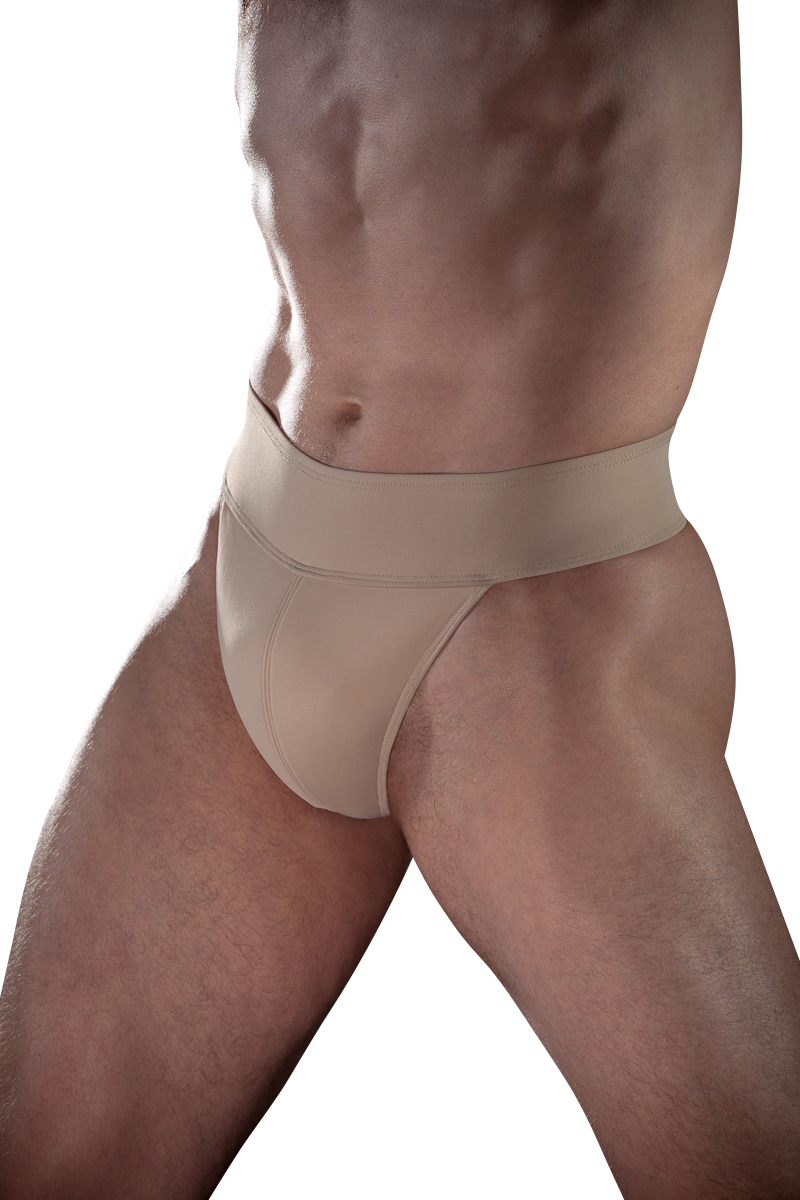
A "nude" dance belt for dancers with light skin

A dance belt is a kind of specialized undergarment commonly worn by male ballet dancers to comfortably support their genitals. Most are similar in design to thong underwear.

Dance belts were developed in the early 1900s for male dancers to wear during training and performances

1. to keep the genitals from moving
2. to present a smooth and inexplicit contour to onlookers, especially under bright stage lighting.

A dance belt resembles a thong undergarment in design but has a wider waist belt, also to give a smooth appearance. From the back, the belt is connected by a narrow piece of elasticized fabric to the bottom of a front triangular panel. This strip is concealed between the buttocks in what is sometimes called a "T-back" design. Other styles have a seat, similar to briefs, but under a tight costume, they risk causing "panty lines".

Unlike an athletic supporter (jock strap), it lacks a pair of elasticized straps from the pouch back out to the upper thighs. The Japanese fundoshi shares some similarities with a dance belt.

The dance belt is usually "flesh coloured"—beige, dark brown or black—to make it less visible under a costume, or white, which can be dyed to any color. Some dances are performed wearing a dance belt alone.

The support pouch can be made of two layers of spandex fabric (or similar); or there may be a thin layer of padding to make the front smoother. The front is generally seamless.

== For other activities ==
Dance belts may also be worn for other public dance styles, and for other activities involving skin-tight costumes, such as figure skating, trapeze, acting, cosplay and equestrian sports. In equestrian sports, especially dressage or other English riding disciplines, the purpose is protection, since trotting in a deep saddle can hurt or injure the testicles, particularly if the rider is inexperienced or has lost balance. The dance belt holds them up out of harm's way.

== See also ==
- Sports bra
