= Open drawers =

Old kind of female undergarments

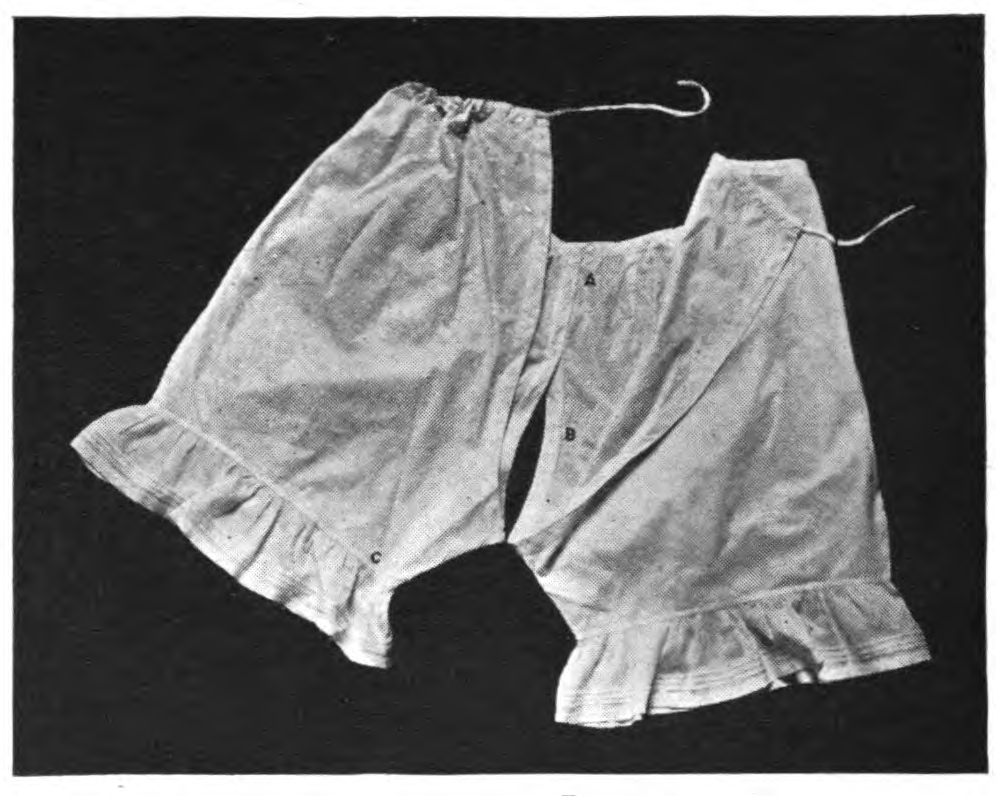
- Photo illustration of open drawers from Garments for Girls, 1919
- Type: Underwear

Open drawers were a type of undergarment worn by women and girls until the early 20th century. Unlike closed drawers with a seam connecting the leg sections, open drawers featured an open-crotch design extending from front to back, allowing for practicality, ease of movement, and improved hygiene in daily wear.

As chemise undergarments shortened, the use of open drawers gradually declined in favour of more fitted and enclosed undergarments, such as closed drawers, and French knickers. By the late 19th century, discussions arose regarding whether women should wear open or closed drawers, reflecting evolving attitudes toward modesty and practicality.

== Description ==
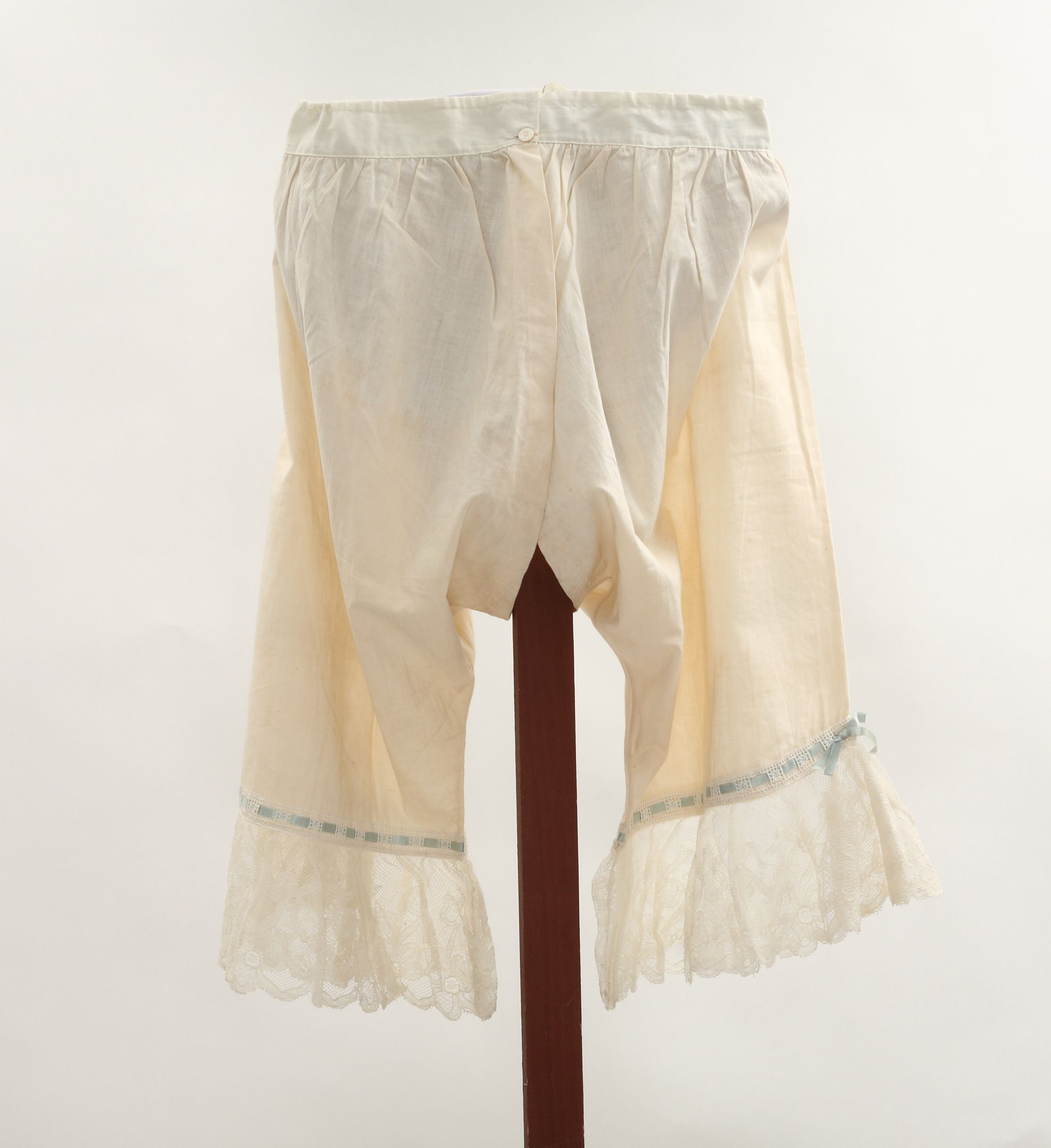
A pair of open drawers with a crocheted lace hem

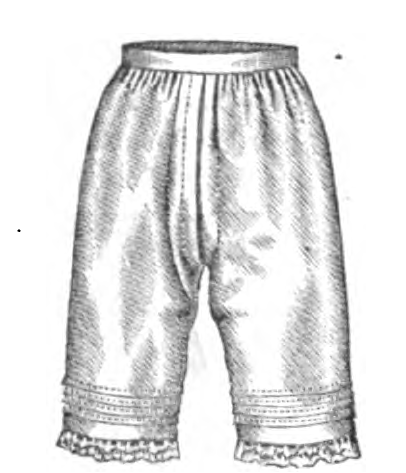
Illustration of ladies' open drawers from Arthur's Lady's Home Magazine, 1874

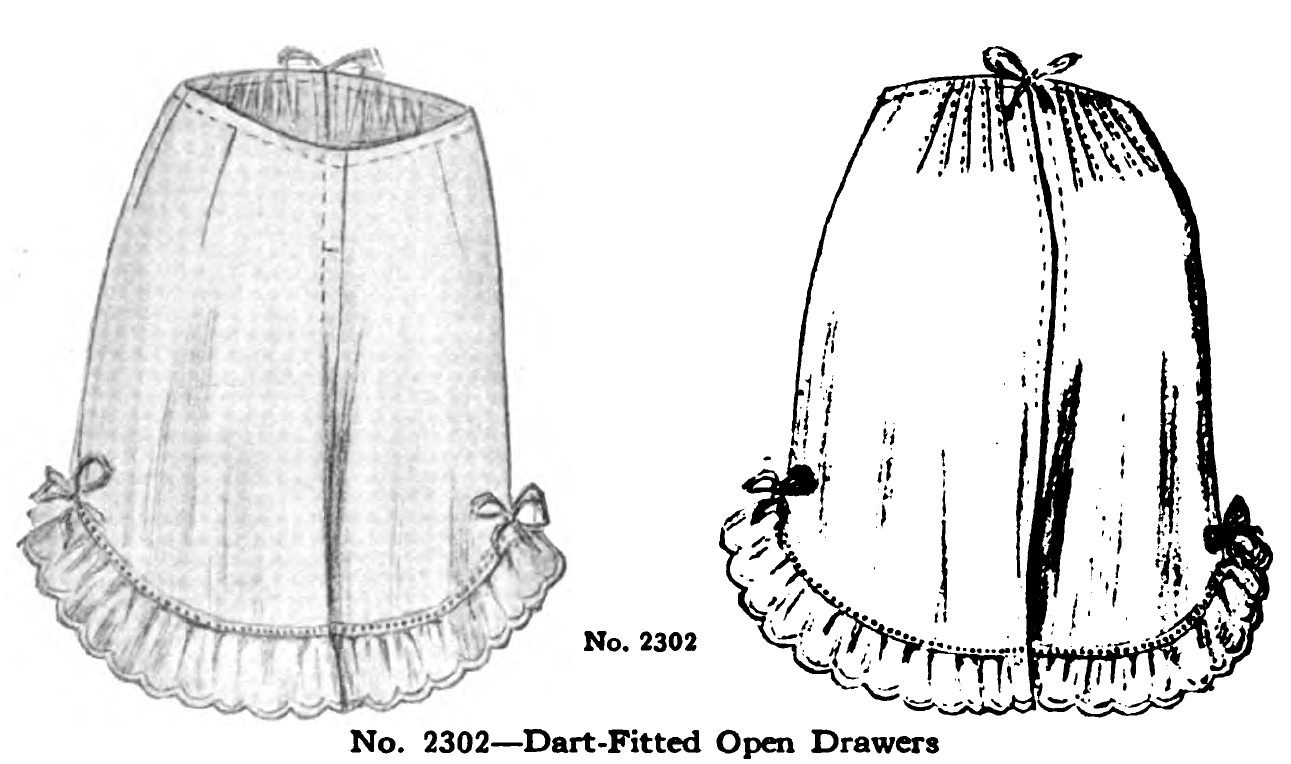
Illustration of dart-fitted open drawers from Woman's Home Companion, 1913

Open drawers are a type of undergarment in which the front and back sections of the legs remain separate, featuring a central split. This design provided ease of movement and allowed wearers to maintain personal hygiene without needing to remove multiple layers of clothing.

Historically, women, girls, and very young boys (before breeching) did not wear undergarments beneath their gowns or dresses. Factors such as ventilation, hygiene, practicality, and moisture control influenced the development of early undergarments, often leading to open styles rather than fully enclosed designs. Menstruation hygiene also played a role in shaping women's undergarments.

In the 18th century, women's undergarments became more common as modesty gained importance, with stays, petticoats, and shifts playing a key role. In the early 19th century, pantalettes became a popular choice for additional coverage beneath gowns and dresses. As fashion evolved, crinoline styles gained prominence in the mid-19th century, further shaping undergarment design. Over time, pantalettes were replaced by open-crotch drawers, which aligned more closely with changing fashion preferences.

Before the invention of elastic waistbands (such as briefs), undergarments were fastened at the waist using ties or, more commonly, buttons. Women typically layered multiple skirts and underskirts over their garments for added coverage and warmth.

The open-crotch design made personal hygiene more convenient, particularly when dealing with multiple layers of clothing. This allowed women to use chamber pots, outhouses, or communal latrines without needing to undress completely—especially beneficial in colder climates or limited-privacy situations.

Beyond hygiene, the design improved airflow, reduced discomfort, and minimized fabric soiling, making it a practical choice when frequent washing was difficult due to limited access to clean water. This style was particularly useful for female farm workers, enabling them to relieve themselves discreetly in the fields without compromising modesty or requiring long trips to distant sanitation facilities.

== Usage ==
In 1894, Elizabeth Rosevear wrote:

Open Drawers. – Girls generally begin to wear open drawers when they are about nine or ten years old. Open drawers are not cut down at the hips, and the band is made all in one piece of the material. The backs and fronts of the legs are not joined together, but hemmed separately, or lined with false hems. The fronts, in children's sizes, are seamed together for about 2 inches, in women's sizes a little more. A button and buttonhole are placed at the ends of the bands, or two tape strings. The legs may be constructed as for closed drawers, i.e. as knickerbockers with bands, or they may be made up with a deep hem, and narrow tucks above. The drawers are gathered or pleated into the bands at the waist and legs. Women's drawers are very seldom made up as closed, but nearly always as open.

As chemises decreased in length, open drawers stopped being used.

== Controversy ==
In the late 19th century, there was discussion over whether or not women should wear open drawers. Dr. E. R. Palmer wrote against their use:

I saw in a paper the other day that ladies in a Canadian city had a grand convention, and had celebrated their magnificent resolve by building in a public square a bonfire, being fed by the corsets they had been wearing. It was a revival of the old tirade against the corset. I have not forgotten what Thomas said, that women should burn their open drawers instead of their corsets. The idea of a beautifully dressed woman with trail sweeping the streets! The idea of that mode of dress being countenanced by the profession!

While the profession are warring against corsets, is it not ridiculous, not to say criminal, for us to take the position that the corset is harmful and the open drawers is not? The knights of old used to protect the genital organs of their wives from receiving germs during the day when they had gone to business. If it is gonorrhea, it is due to external infection, and I hold that infection takes place as frequently in this as in any other way on account of the delicate organ being unprotected.

Conversely, E. R. Shepherd wrote in favor of the open drawers:

Many physicians oppose the wearing of closed drawers by women. In bad cases of leucorrhoea the odor arising from the discharged confined from the air in this way becomes extremely offensive to the patient at least, and may extend beyond the confines of the dress, and when she comes near the stove or register, if at no other time, to be detected by the bystanders. A free circulation of air by open drawers is wholesome to the parts, as well as a deodorizer. It is well enough for little girls, and even advisable for them to wear tight drawers, but it is probably best for young ladies and women to wear them open.

== See also ==
- Pantalettes
- Open-crotch pants, commonly worn by toddlers throughout mainland China
