= Tights =

Heavy, opaque stockings woven in one with panties

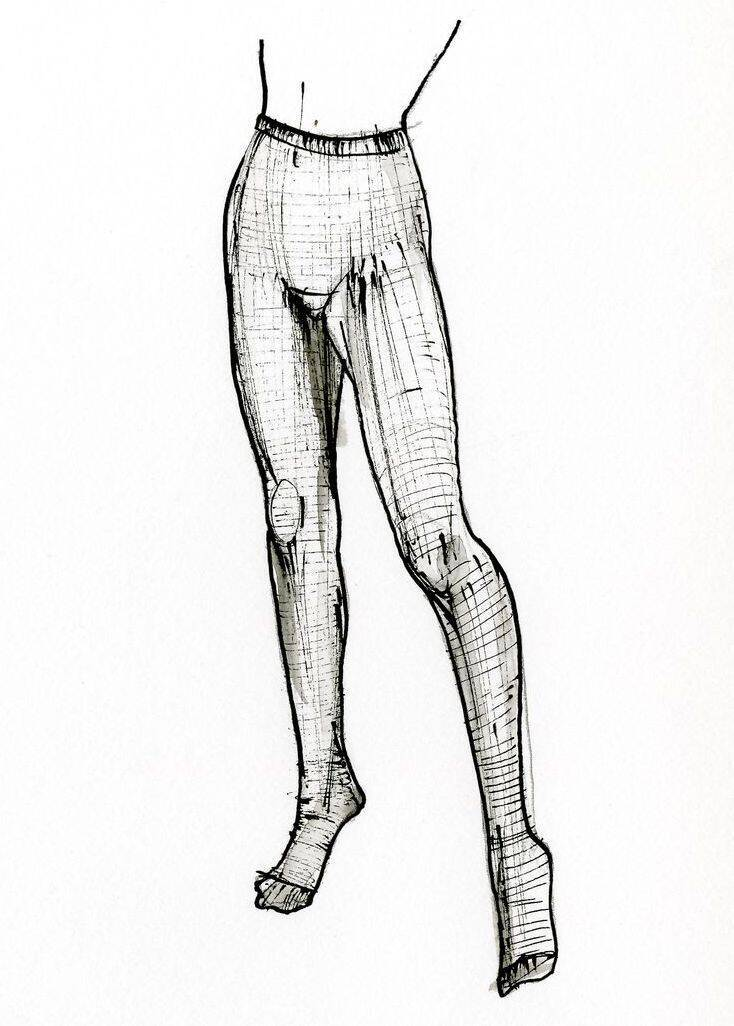
Drawing of tights with reinforced crotch and toes. Actual most similar item can be with seams on the sides of the legs or seamless

Tights are a kind of cloth garment, most often sheathing the body from the waist to the toe tips with a tight fit, hence the name. They come in absolute opaque, opaque, sheer and fishnet styles — or a combination, such as the original concept of the American term pantyhose with sheer legs and opaque panty. A variant, toe tights, are tights with individual toes, in the same way toe socks are socks with individual toes.

== Terminology and related clothing ==
When made of fine silk, this hosiery was considered to be a stocking. When nylon fibres were developed and introduced in the 1940s, these stockings were referred to as nylons. When the separate legs were woven together with a panty that covered the lower torso up to the waist in a single, integrated format, the term pantyhose was coined, since it was a one piece construction of a panty with a pair of separate hose, one for each leg. This joining together eliminated any need for garters for holding up each separate leg covering.

In American English, the difference between pantyhose and tights is determined in the weight of the yarn used and the density or tightness of weaving to which the garment is knitted. Generally, anything up to forty denier in the leg or overall is known as pantyhose and anything over that can be classified as tights, as for example 'running tights' and 'cycling tights'. Tights can be sheer yet solid in colour, whereas leggings are practically or absolutely opaque, not sheer. Thus, the almost-opaque tights are sometimes labelled as semi-opaque and are not considered suitable as pants due to being too revealing or immodest. In the United Kingdom, the word "tights" is used for footed garments, which would always be worn under another item of clothing such as shorts or a skirt, while "leggings" refers to footless leg-wear of any denier, the exception being ballet tights which may have an opening under the sole allowing them to be rolled up to expose the foot without removing the garment. The word 'pantyhose' is not used in British English.

There are many sub-classifications of tights or pantyhose that describe the precise construction (such as control top, seamless, support and sheer). Although most tights are mainly nylon or cotton, lycra is normally included in modern blends to improve fit. Athletic tights are absolute opaque and often footless, although they may have a "stirrup" that goes under the foot to hold the cuff down near the ankle.

== Historical background ==
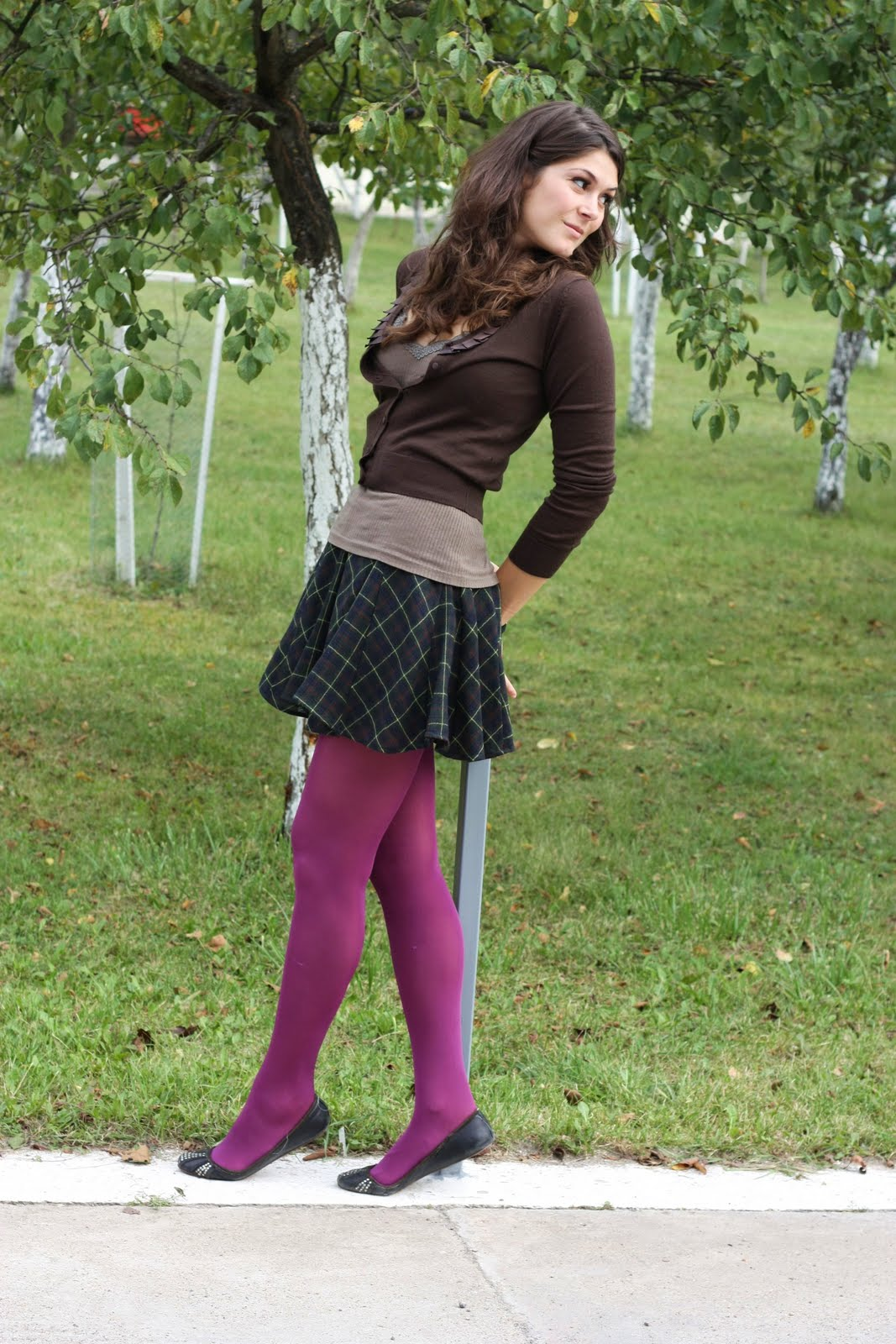
A woman wearing tights under a skirt

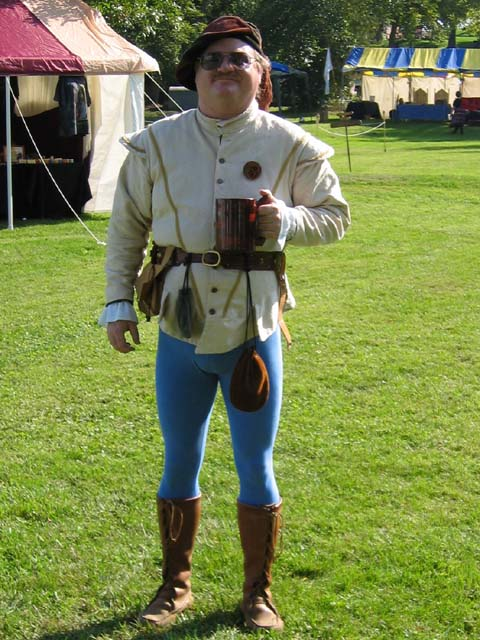
Renaissance-era costume

Henry VIII of England in tights

Originally, leggings covered only the legs (not the lower torso); were two separate pieces; and did not contain elastic fibres, so were cut close fitting (to use less fabric) and were loose, not tight.

Originally derived from the hose worn by European men several centuries ago, tights were made as close fitting as possible for practical reasons when riding horseback. For men of nobility, the material would be made of silk or fine wool rather than the coarser fabrics used by the lower classes. At the time of King Henry VIII of England, such was the male fashion for displaying a well turned leg that even the king padded the calf area under his hose. Portrait paintings of him and other nobility often portray the wearing of a codpiece covering the groin.

In both historic and modern times, the wearing of tight hosiery by males has been associated with an accompanying garment fitted at the groin over the male genitalia. In the 15th century, some men wore an elaborate and decorative codpiece to accentuate their endowment. In modern times, tights intended for dancers are usually opaque, although their form-fitting nature can still reveal the exact contours of the anatomy underneath. Male ballet dancers generally wear a dance belt beneath their tights both to provide support to the genitalia and to promote a smooth, regular appearance. Wearing two pairs of tights is also a common practice among male dancers, as it guards against the combination of stretched fabric and bright stage lights making them appear translucent.

The wearing of tights has a history going back several centuries, when they were worn by both men and women. Today, they are worn primarily by women and girls. In recent years, however, they have been offered as men's fashion.

== Current use ==
Tights are most commonly worn with a skirt or dress by women. They are also most commonly worn under trousers or shorts by men.

In the world of theatre tights are also common, especially in Renaissance-era costumes, and dance, particularly in ballet.

The term "tights" has been used to try to ridicule certain traditional British uniform. Most famously the Serjeants-at-Arms at the Palace of Westminster, after a protester got past the security, were described in the media as "middle aged men in tights."

=== Athletic use ===
For horseback riding, "tights" in some equestrian circles can refer to tightly fitting riding pants of light material that extend all the way down to the rider's ankle and worn with a 'paddock' style (ankle height) boot. Such pants are worn in summer or as an undergarment in winter. In warm climates they can be worn all year round. These "riding tights" are cheaper to buy than jodhpurs or breeches which are a type of riding pant made of heavier material and which extends only to mid calf length and are intended to be worn with tall riding boots.

Tights can also describe the leg coverings worn in bicycling in cold weather and in other athletic activities, especially by runners. These tights are usually a thicker spandex-blend, and are usually footless. It has also been advocated by some sport scientists that the wearing of tights can reduce muscle tissue vibration.

Athletic tights received some publicity during the 2005–2006 basketball season, when players started wearing the ankle-length tights under their uniform shorts. A prominent NBA player, Kobe Bryant, was one of the first to wear tights, and the style was subsequently adopted by several other NBA players, as well as some college and high school players. The style sparked controversy, leading to proposals to prohibit wearing tights with basketball uniforms.

In colder temperatures outdoors, American football players sometimes wear spandex tights next to their skin beneath their normal padded stretchy, tightly fitted pants. In British English such garments are referred to as 'skins'. Athletic tights are considered unisex.

=== Health and beauty use ===
Because the fabric used in tights is made of interwoven fabric such as nylon or cotton, there are pores in the fabric where modern manufacturers have been able to place other items which benefit the skin. They can use microencapsulation techniques to place substances such as moisturizers and other skin creams in the tights.

== Design features ==
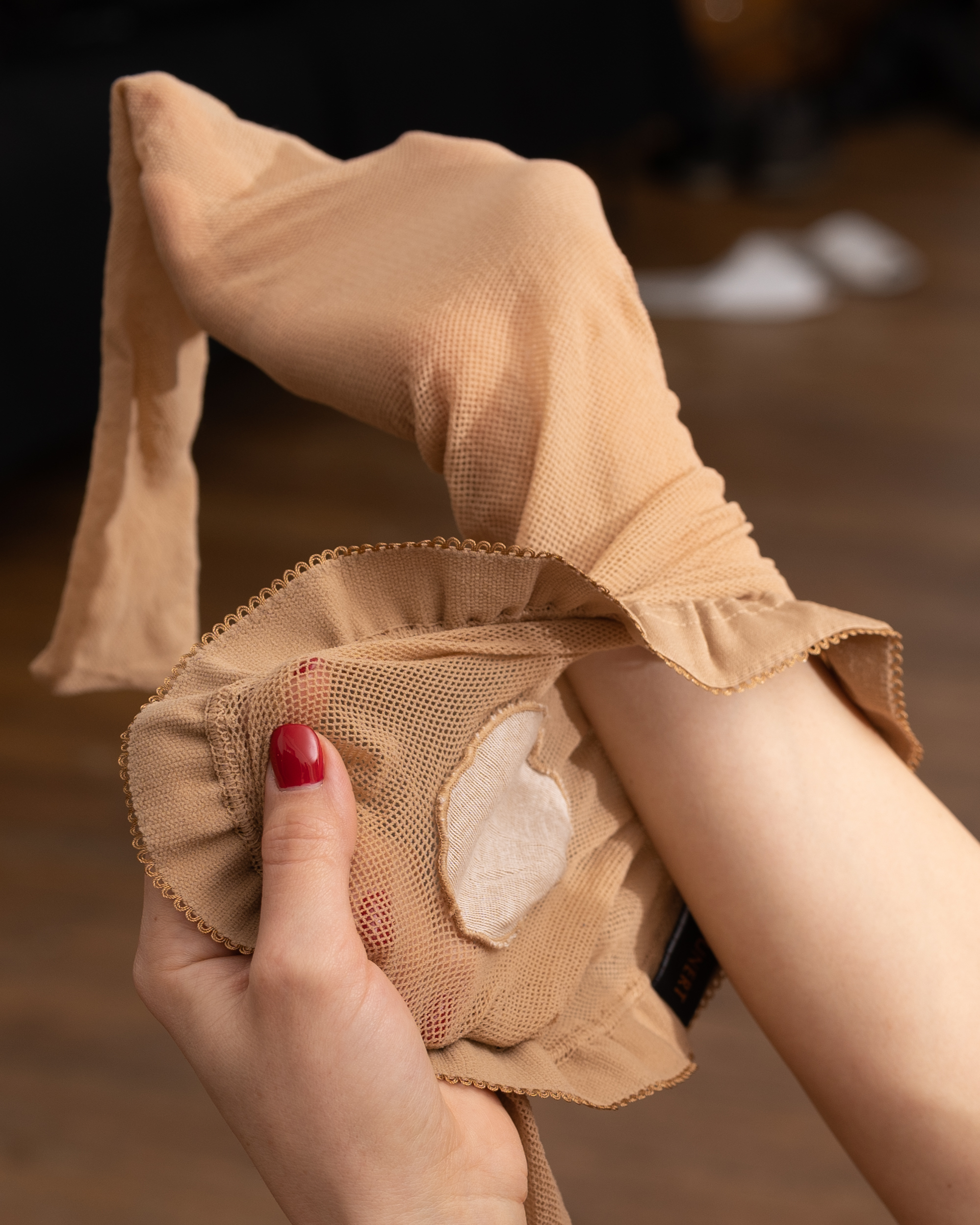
Sewn-in cotton lined crotch in white. Outside dyed to match the seamless net tights.

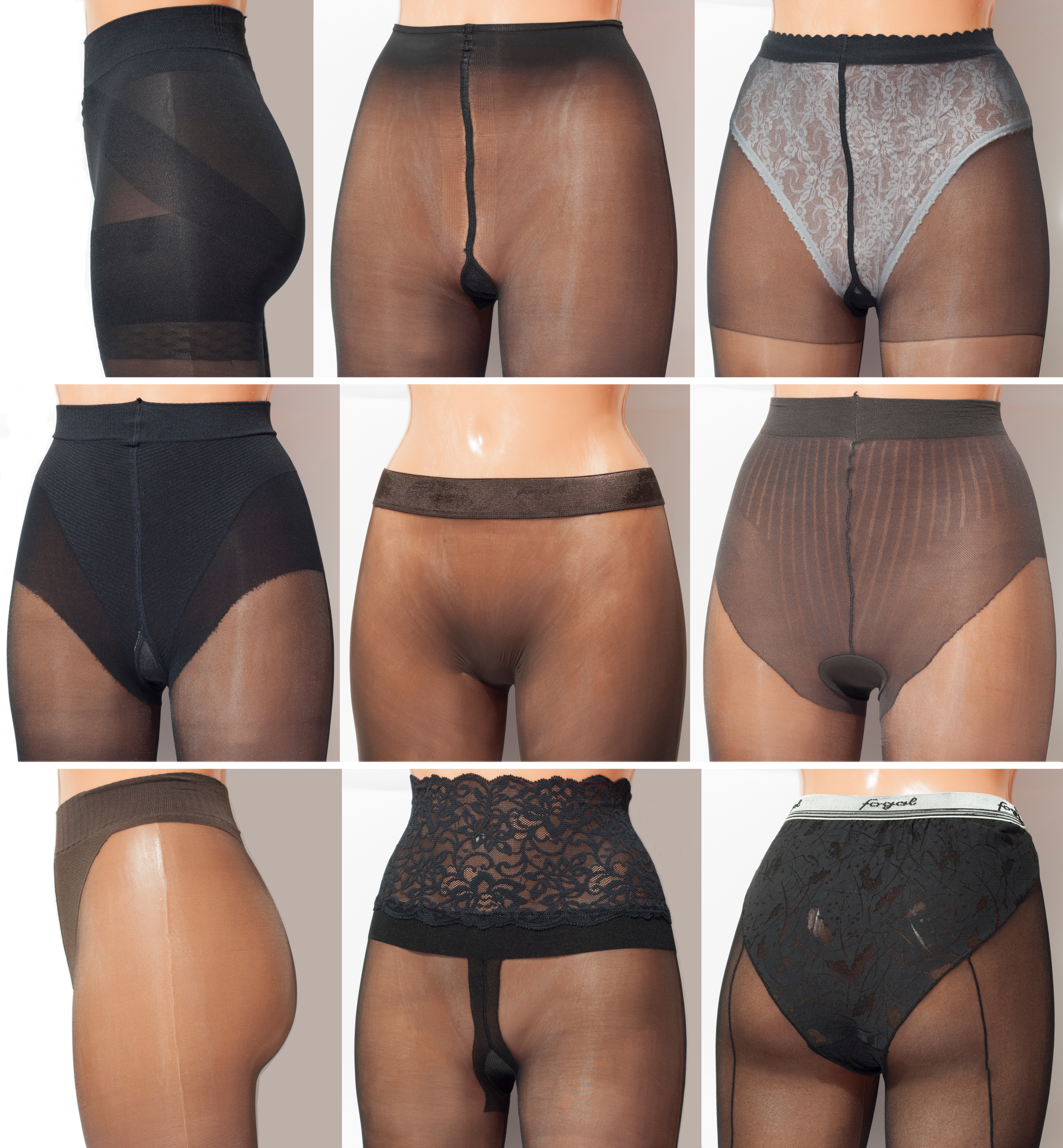
Overview of different top sections of sheer tights (pantyhose in the US). From the very common to the very rare

Tights are manufactured in many different varieties for stylistic and comfort reasons. Certain leg wear designs include a darker brief or no visible brief at all, the former being used to create extra support or a shaping effect.

One area where design is vastly different from model to model is in the toe area. There are several varieties of toe type, such as sandal toes, open toes and reinforced, all offering different effects. Whilst some descriptions of the difference between open toe and sandal toe can cause confusion, the industry standard is that a sandal toe covers the whole foot but without a seam that would be visible in an open shoe, and open toe tights use either a silicone band or toe loops to anchor the garment whilst leaving the toes uncovered.

== Gallery ==
Various uses and types of tights

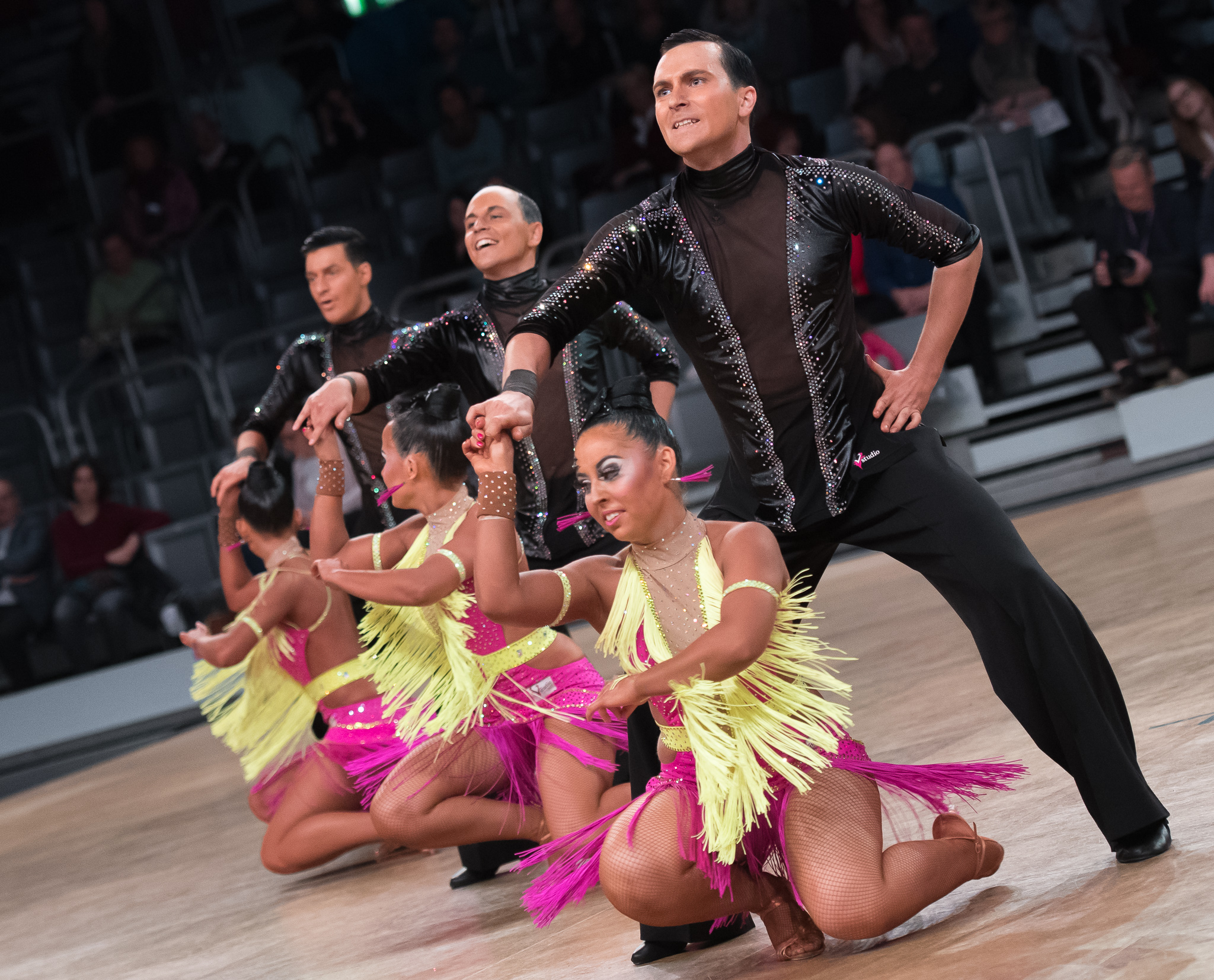
Fishnet tights worn by professional dancers

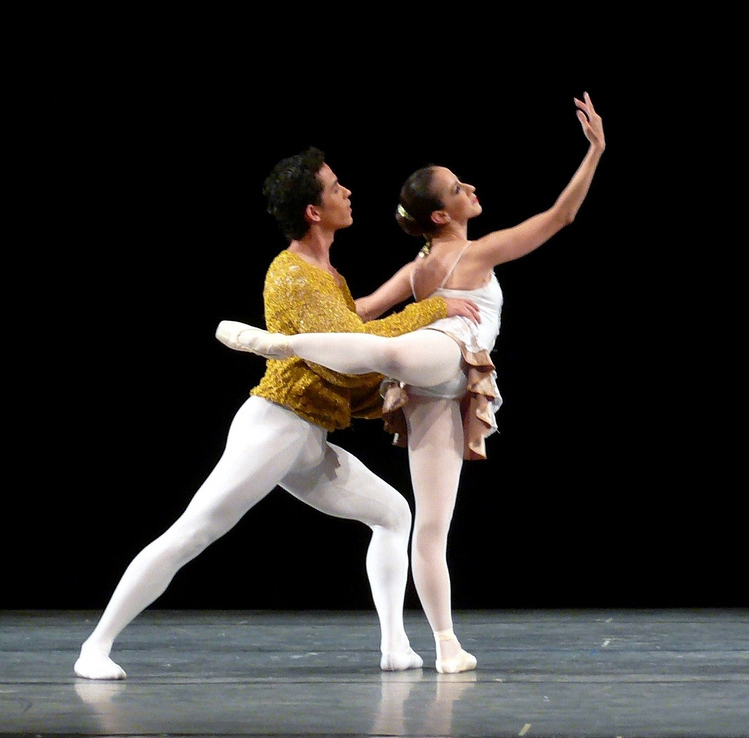
Tights as outerwear by males and partly as underwear by females on stage

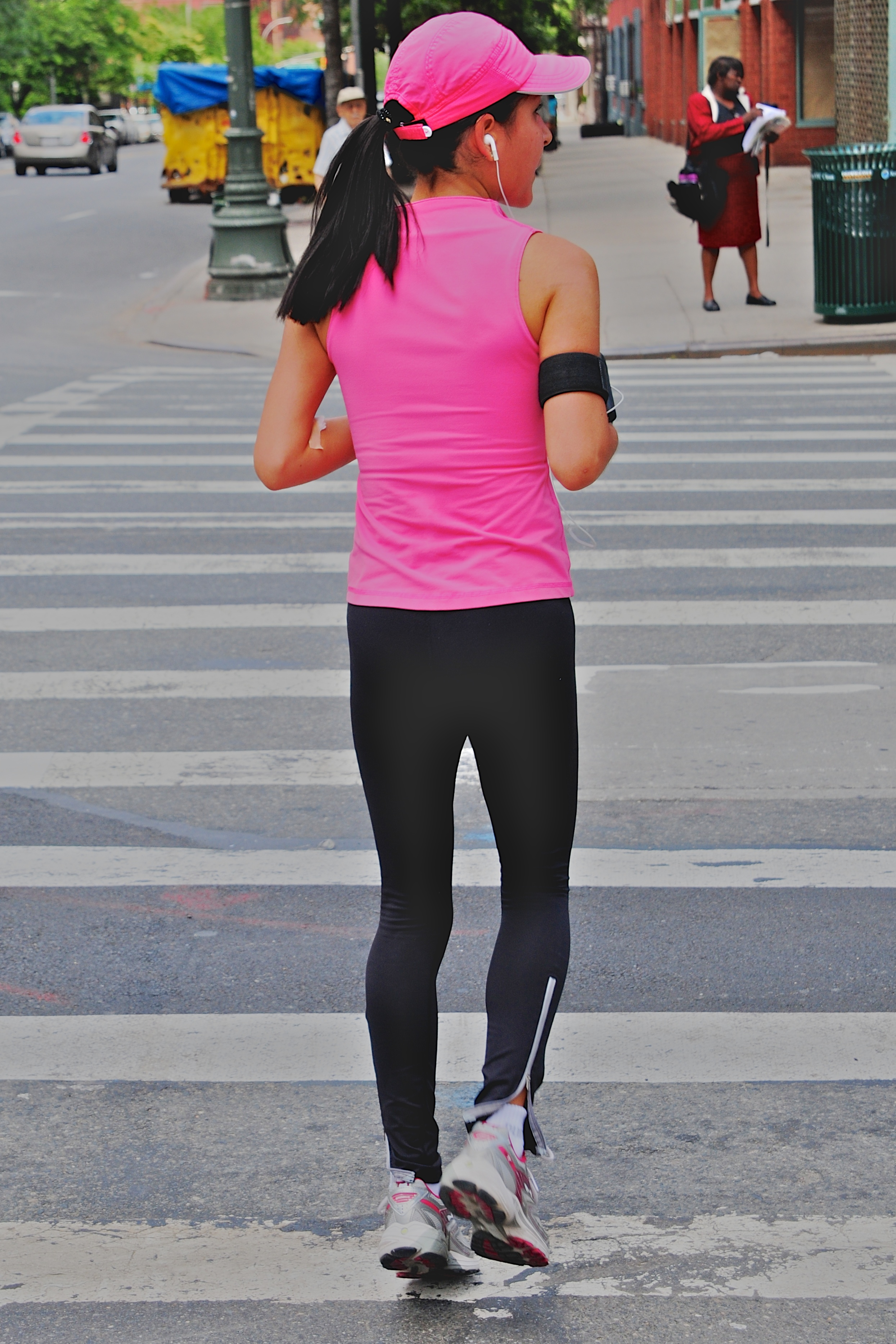
Running tights as outerwear

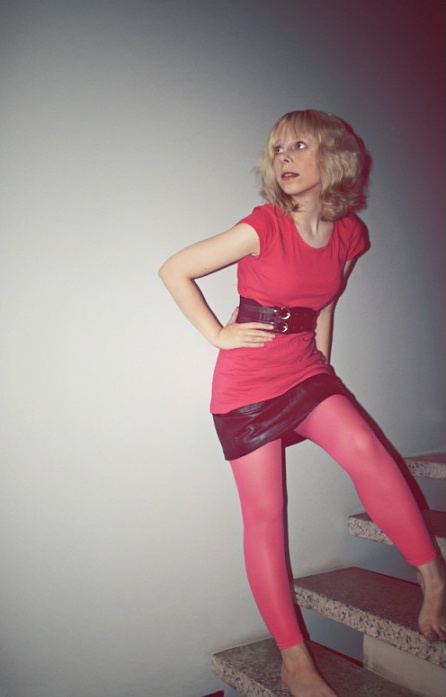
Opaque footless tights under a skirt

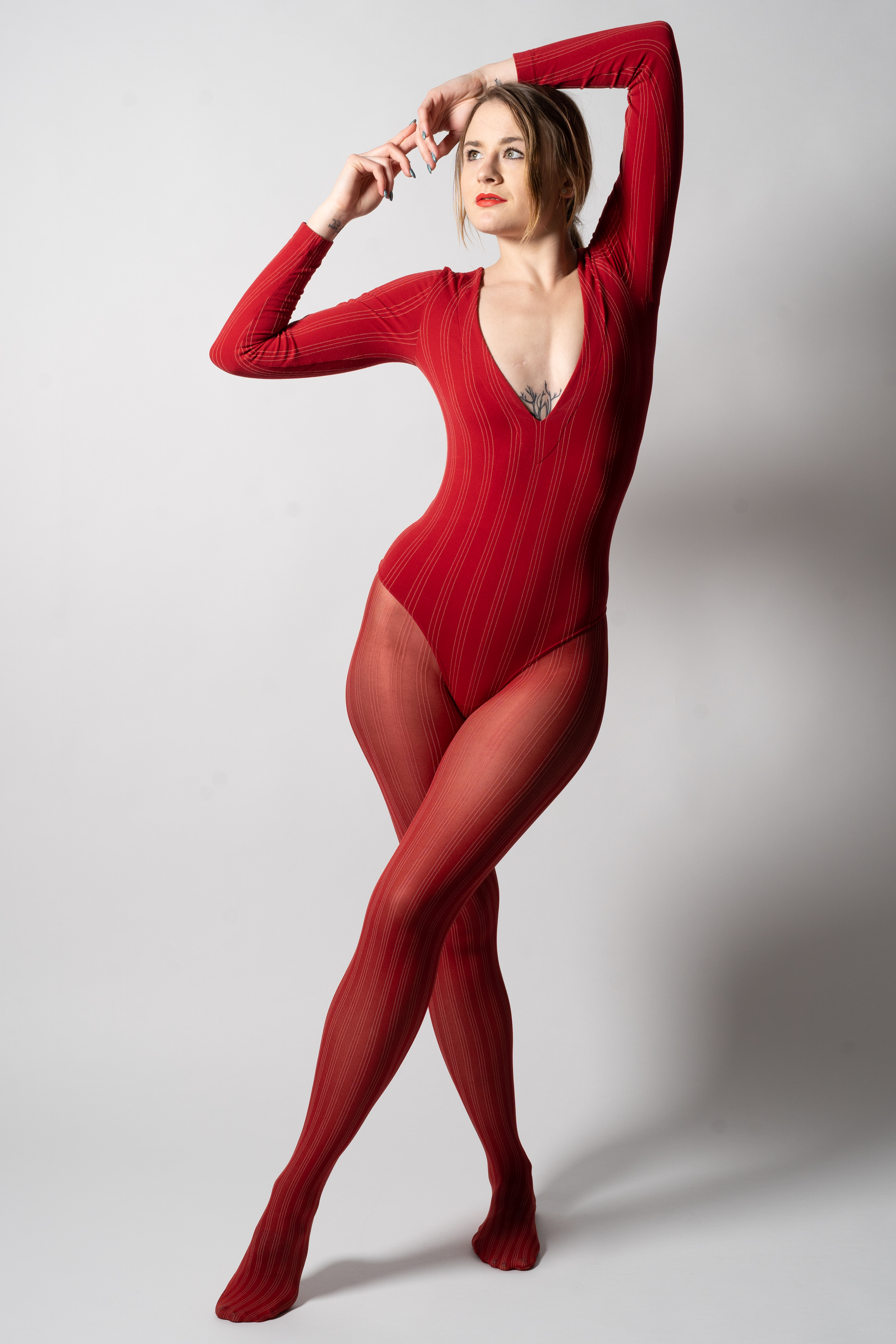
Woman wearing red tights that were produced on the same type of machinery as the bodysuit

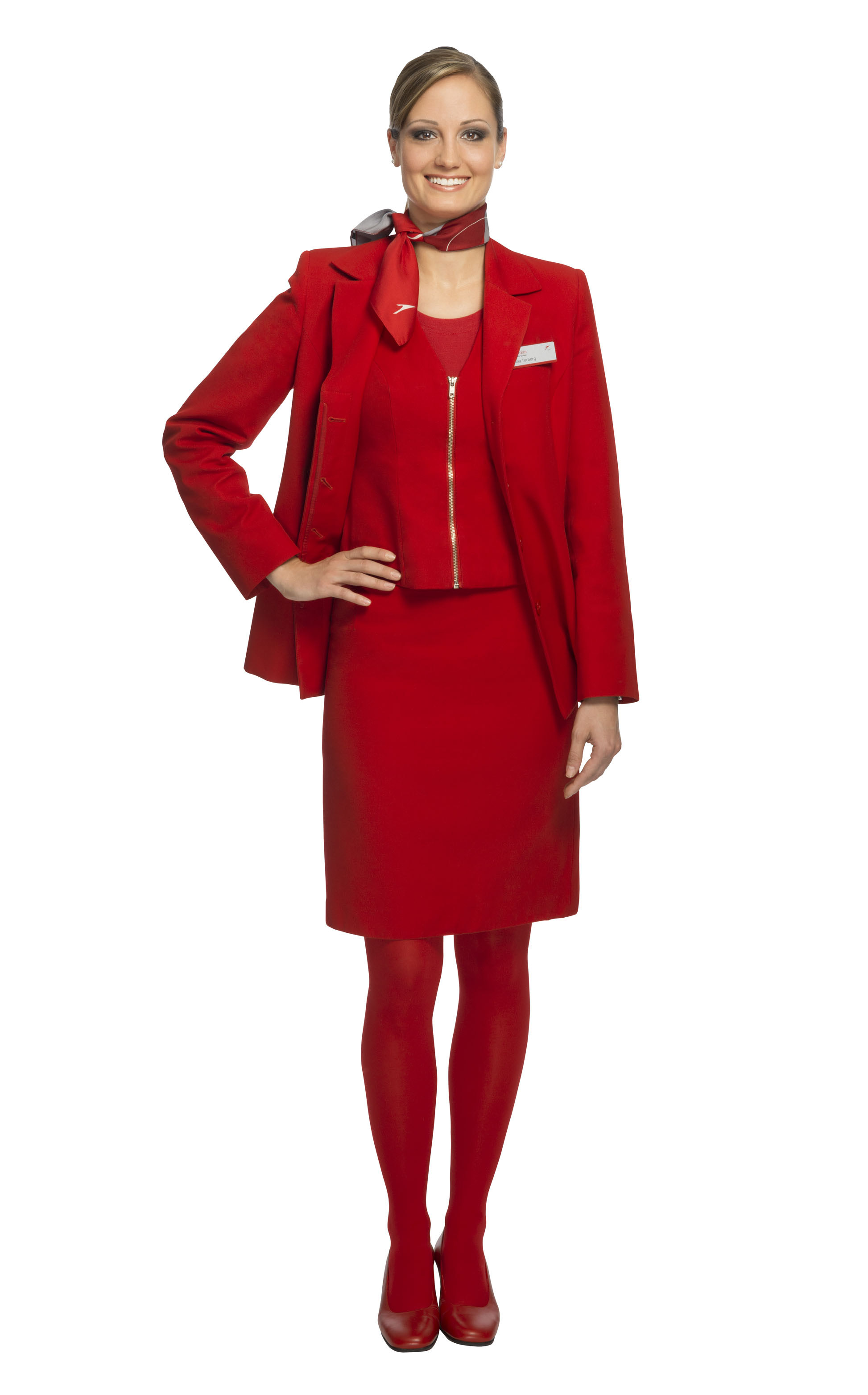
Tights as part of a uniform for female employees

== See also ==
- Compression garment
- Leggings
- Pantyhose
- Stocking
- Underwear fetishism
