= G-string =

Garment consisting of a strip of cloth between the legs

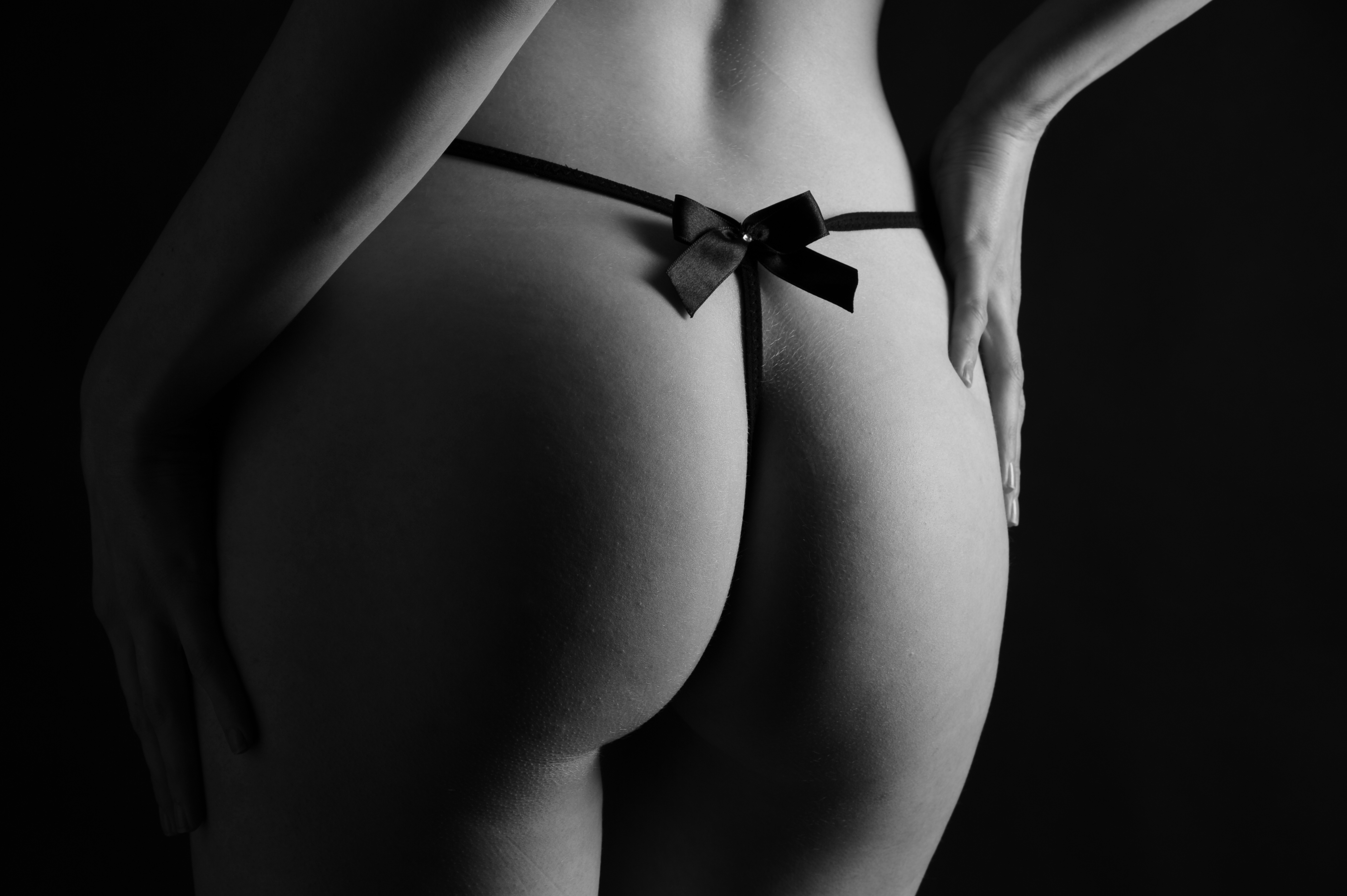
A black and white photo of a woman in a G-string

A G-string is a garment consisting of a narrow piece of material that barely covers the genitals, a string-like piece that passes between the buttocks, and a very thin waistband around the hips. There are designs for both women and men. Men's G-strings are similar to women's, but have a front pouch that covers the genitals. G-strings are typically worn as underwear or swimwear or as part of the costume of an exotic dancer.

G-strings are usually made of fabric, lace, leather, or satin. They may serve as a bikini bottom or they may be worn alone as monokinis or topless swimsuits. G-strings are also worn by go-go dancers.

As underwear, G-strings may be worn in preference to panties to avoid the creation of a visible panty line, or in order to enhance sex appeal.

The two terms G-string and thong are sometimes used interchangeably; however, technically they refer to different pieces of clothing. G-strings have a thinner back strip than thongs, and usually a thinner waistband. These connectors are often made of string rather than a strip of fabric.

== Etymology ==
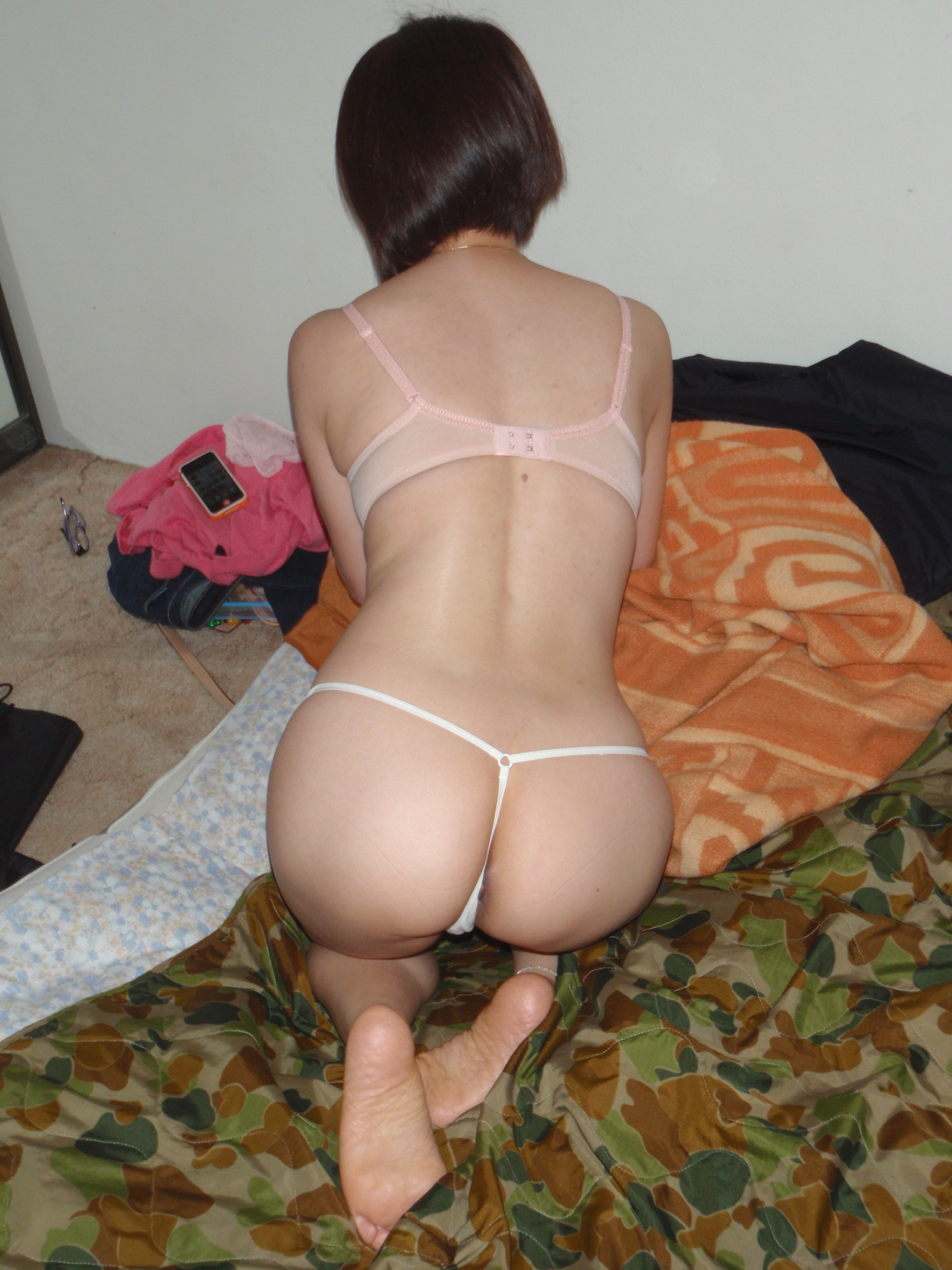
Woman wearing a G-string

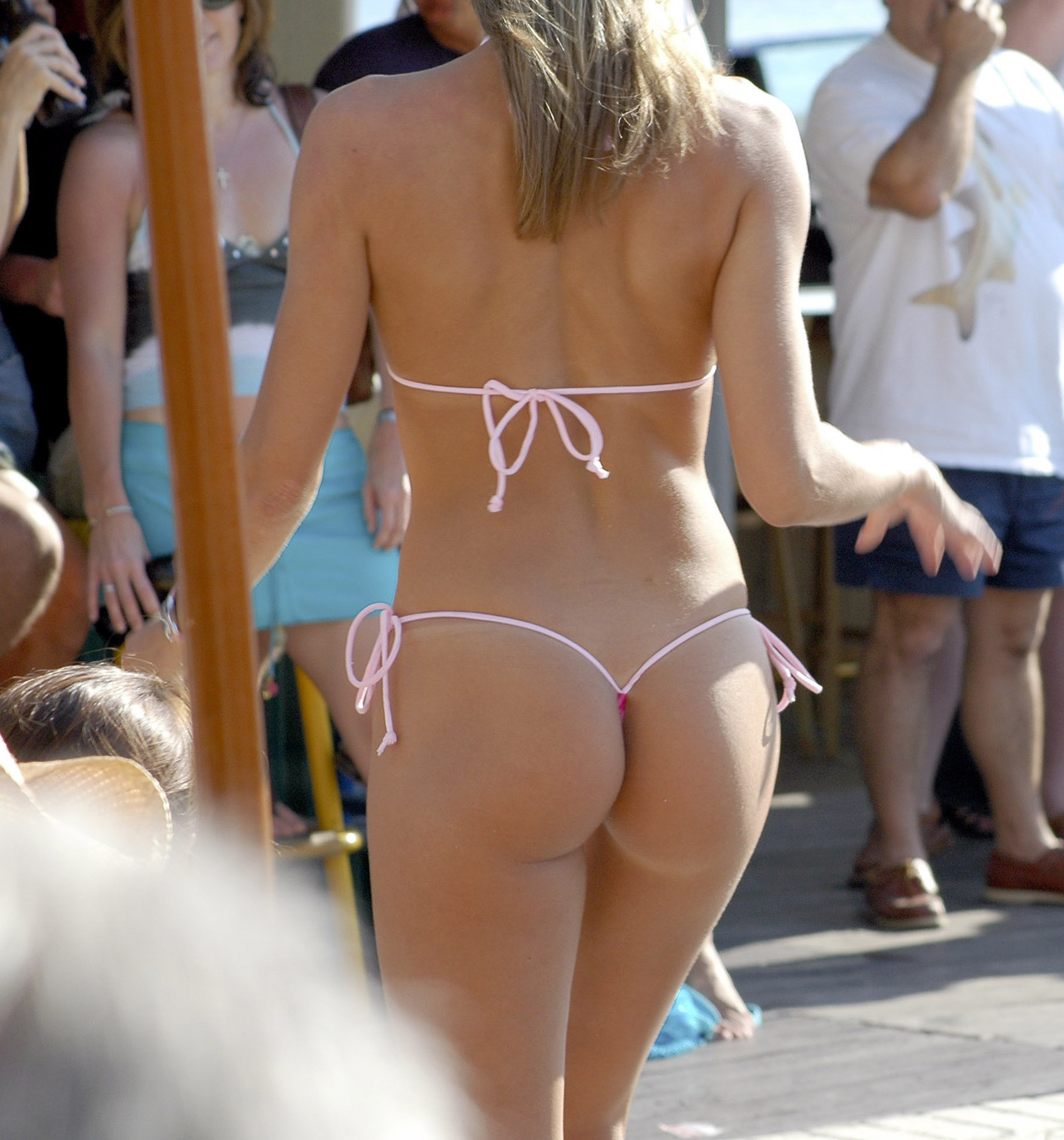
A woman wearing a pink G-string.

The term G-string is first attested in 1878. It originally denoted the loincloths worn by certain Native Americans, and did not come to be used for a type of female undergarment until the 1920s. The significance of the G is unclear. It has been suggested that it represents a euphemistic abbreviation of groin, or else that it is short for girdle; the term girdle-string is attested as early as 1846.

== History ==
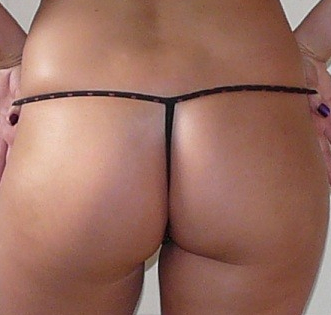
Woman wearing a black G-string

The G-string first appeared in costumes worn by showgirls in the United States in Earl Carroll's productions during the 1920s, a period known as the Jazz Age or the Roaring Twenties. Before the Great Depression most performers made their own G-strings or bought them from traveling salesmen, but from the 1930s they were usually purchased from commercial manufacturers of burlesque costumes. During the 1930s, the "Chicago G-string" gained prominence when worn by performers like Margie Hart. The Chicago area was the home of some of the largest manufacturers of G-strings and it also became the center of the burlesque shows in the United States. Early performers of color to wear a G-string on stage included the Latina stripper Chiquita Garcia in 1934, and "Princess Whitewing", a Native American stripper near the end of the decade.

The term G-string started to appear in Variety magazine during the 1930s. In New York City, G-strings were worn by female dancers at risqué Broadway theatre shows during the Jazz Age. During the 1930s and 1940s, the New York striptease shows in which G-strings were worn were described as "strong". In shows referred to as "weak" or "sweet" the stripper wore "net panties" instead. "Strong" shows usually took place only when the police were not present, and they became rarer after 1936 when Fiorello H. La Guardia, the Mayor of New York City, organized a series of police raids on burlesque shows and closed strip clubs in the city for the first time in its history. The Mayor also banned showgirls from performing fully nude at the 1939 New York World's Fair. To give the illusion that they were completely naked, showgirls sometimes wore G-strings that were flesh-coloured or made of wool or fur to resemble pubic hair.

The American burlesque entertainer Gypsy Rose Lee is popularly associated with the G-string. Her striptease performances often included the wearing of a G-string; in a memoir written by her son Erik Lee Preminger she is described as gluing on a black lace G-string with spirit gum in preparation for a performance.

By the late 1980s G-strings had become widely available in the Western world, and they became increasingly popular during the 1990s. Men's G-strings had developed from garments worn by physical culture and bodybuilding models, and in 1994 a men's G-string was the best selling design of HOM, a luxury men's underwear brand owned by Triumph International. Other underwear brands, such as Sloggi and Jockey International, also introduced men's G-strings. In Africa the G-string has become a fashionable item of clothing for young women, and they are often visible above the back of low-rise jeans as a whale tail. As lingerie they are sometimes worn with a babydoll.

In modern strip clubs, the strippers often wear G-strings and the customers often give them tips by placing banknotes in their G-strings. The wearing of G-strings in strip clubs is required in some jurisdictions under laws that prohibit public nudity. Some regulations cover the design of G-string allowed. These regulations have in many cases been determined by liquor boards and can differ significantly over a short distance. The constitutional legality of such regulations has been upheld in two cases by the US Supreme Court, when it had to rule on whether First Amendment rights were being infringed.

Disposable G-strings are sometimes worn for modesty when spray tan is being applied at a beauty salon.
