= Thong =

Garment worn as underwear or as part of a swimsuit

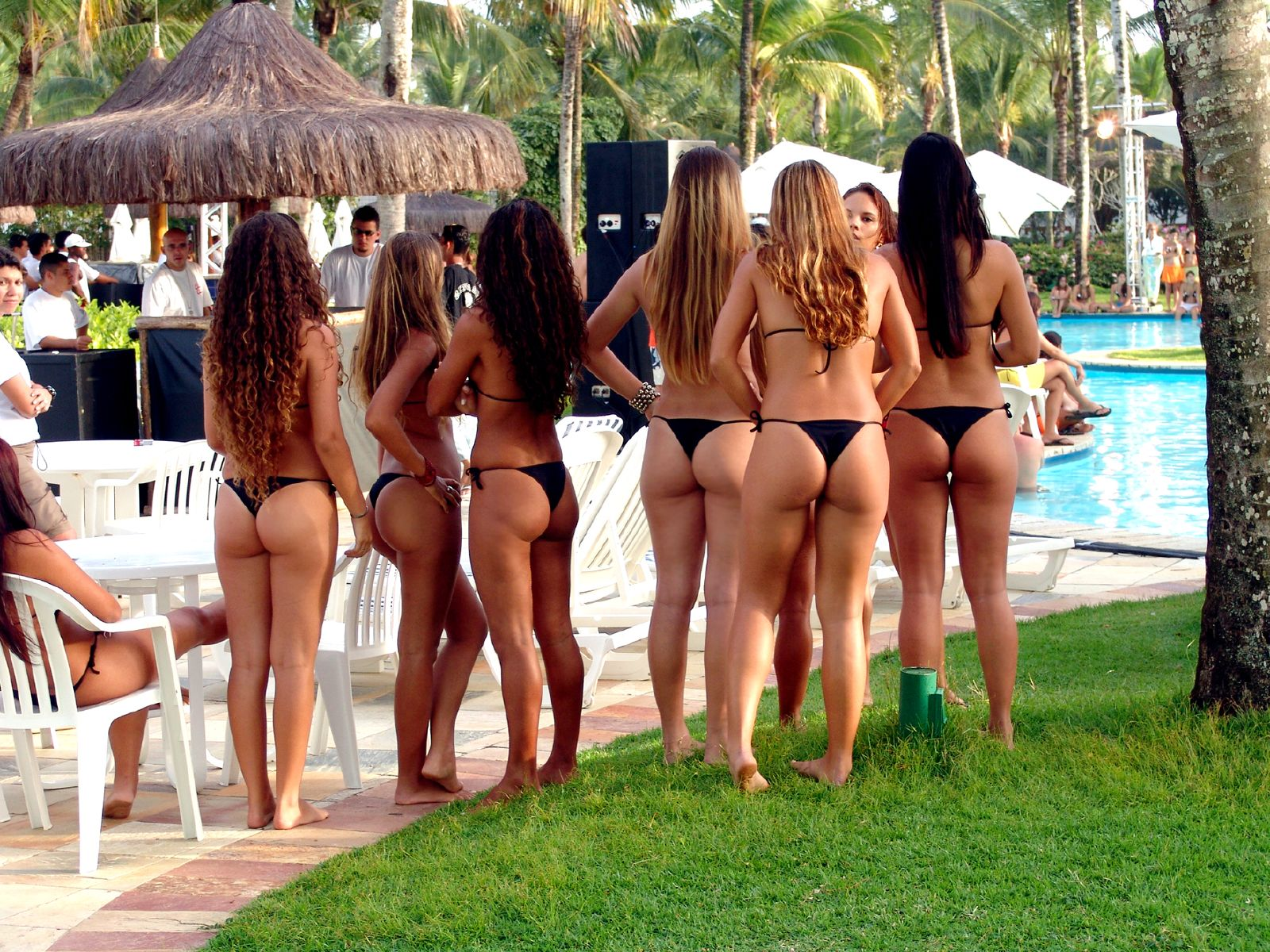
A group of young women in thong bikinis

The thong is a garment generally used as either underwear or in some countries, as a swimsuit. It may also be worn for traditional ceremonies or competitions.

Viewed from the front, the thong typically resembles a bikini bottom, while at the back the material is reduced to a minimum. Thongs are almost always designed to cover the genitals, anus, and perineum and leave part or most of the buttocks uncovered. The back of the garment typically consists of a thin waistband and a thin strip of material, designed to be worn between the buttocks, that connects the middle of the waistband with the bottom front of the garment. It is also used as a descriptive term in other types of garment, such as a bodysuit, bodystocking, leotard, or one-piece swimsuit, with the meaning "thong-backed".

One type of thong is the G-string, the back of which consists only of a (typically elasticized) string. The two terms G-string and thong are often used interchangeably; however, they can refer to distinct pieces of clothing. Thongs come in a variety of styles depending on the thickness, material or type of the rear portion of fabric and are used by both men and women throughout most of the world.

A tanga is a pair of briefs consisting of small panels connected by strings at the sides. There are tanga briefs both for men and for women. The style and the word come from Brazil where it is Portuguese for "thong".

== Nomenclature ==
The origin of the word thong in the English language is from Old English þwong, a flexible leather cord.

Many languages borrow the English word string to refer to this type of underwear, usually without the G. Another common name is tanga (or sometimes string tanga), especially in German Tanga. A frequent metaphor, especially in Brazil, is dental floss; in Brazil a thong is called fio dental (Portuguese for 'dental floss'); in English, the term "Butt floss" is sometimes used. In Lithuanian it is siaurikės ('narrows'), in Italian perizoma or tanga, in Turkish ipli külot ('stringed underpants'), and in Bulgarian as prashka (прашка), which means a slingshot. In Israel the thong, mostly the G-string, is called khutini' (חוטיני), from the word khut, which means 'string'. Similarly, in Iran, it is called shortbandi (شورت بندی) in which short (شورت, from English: shorts) means 'briefs' and bandi means 'with a string'. A Puerto Rican Spanish slang term, used by Reggaeton artists, is gistro.

Some names for the thong make reference to the bareness of the buttocks, such as the Spanish word colaless. (The word's origin is probably connected to the English term topless but in reference to cola, a colloquial word meaning 'butt' in South American Spanish.) In some other languages the "T"-like shape of the back is emphasised. In Chinese, the thong is commonly called dingziku (丁字褲/丁字裤) which literally means '丁 character pants' (or roughly, 'T-letter pants'). In Korean, it is called 티팬티 (T panty). The term T-back is sometimes used in English, as in the novel T-Backs, T-Shirts, COAT, and Suit by E. L. Konigsburg.

=== Thong vs. G-string ===
Colloquially, thongs and G-strings are often used interchangeably to describe skimpy underwear with minimal back coverage, although the main difference is usually attributed to the width of the strap in the rear. This is a definition reflected in the Encyclopedia of Clothing and Fashion, which considers the G-string or thong to be "a panty front with a half- to one-inch strip of fabric at the back that sits between the buttocks", using the terms interchangeably. Conversely, Knickers: a Brief History says: "Minor tweaks to the cut earned these skimpy panties different titles—from the thong, which has a one-inch strip of fabric down the back, to a G-string, which, as the name equivalent of Spanish suggests (hilo dental), is more like a string of fabric akin between the teeth."

Alternatively, some sources have attributed thongs to be a derivation of the G-string, as claimed by Striptease: the Untold History of the Girlie Show. Similarly, the Heinemann English Dictionary describes "thong" as a very skimpy style of undergarment or swimsuit, similar to a G-string. A reverse description is used in Americanisms: the Illustrated Book of Words Made in the USA, which calls the G-string as a type of thong invented in 1936 and attributed to strippers, that consists of a small triangular piece of fabric connected by two elastic straps.

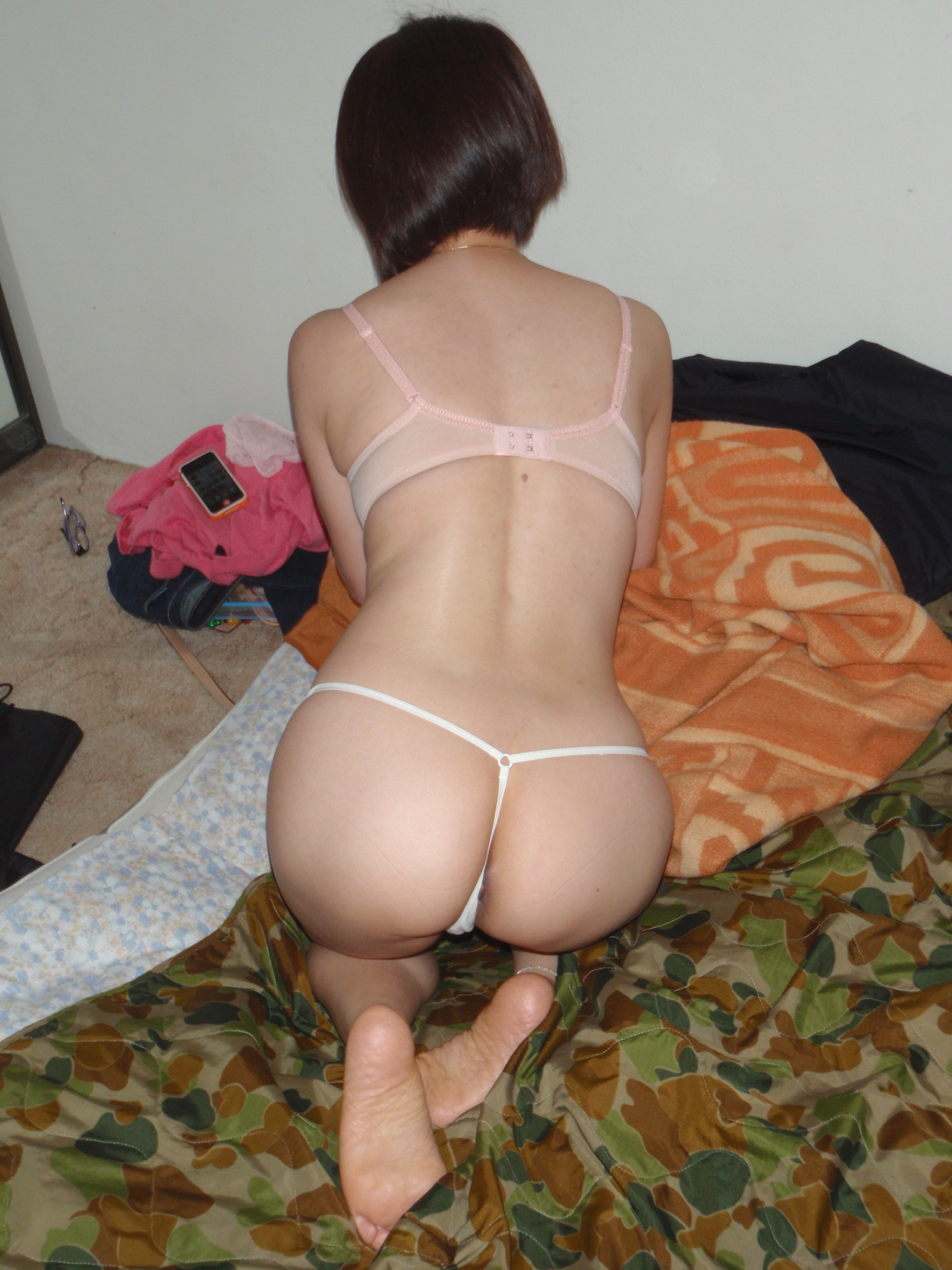
Woman wearing a G-string

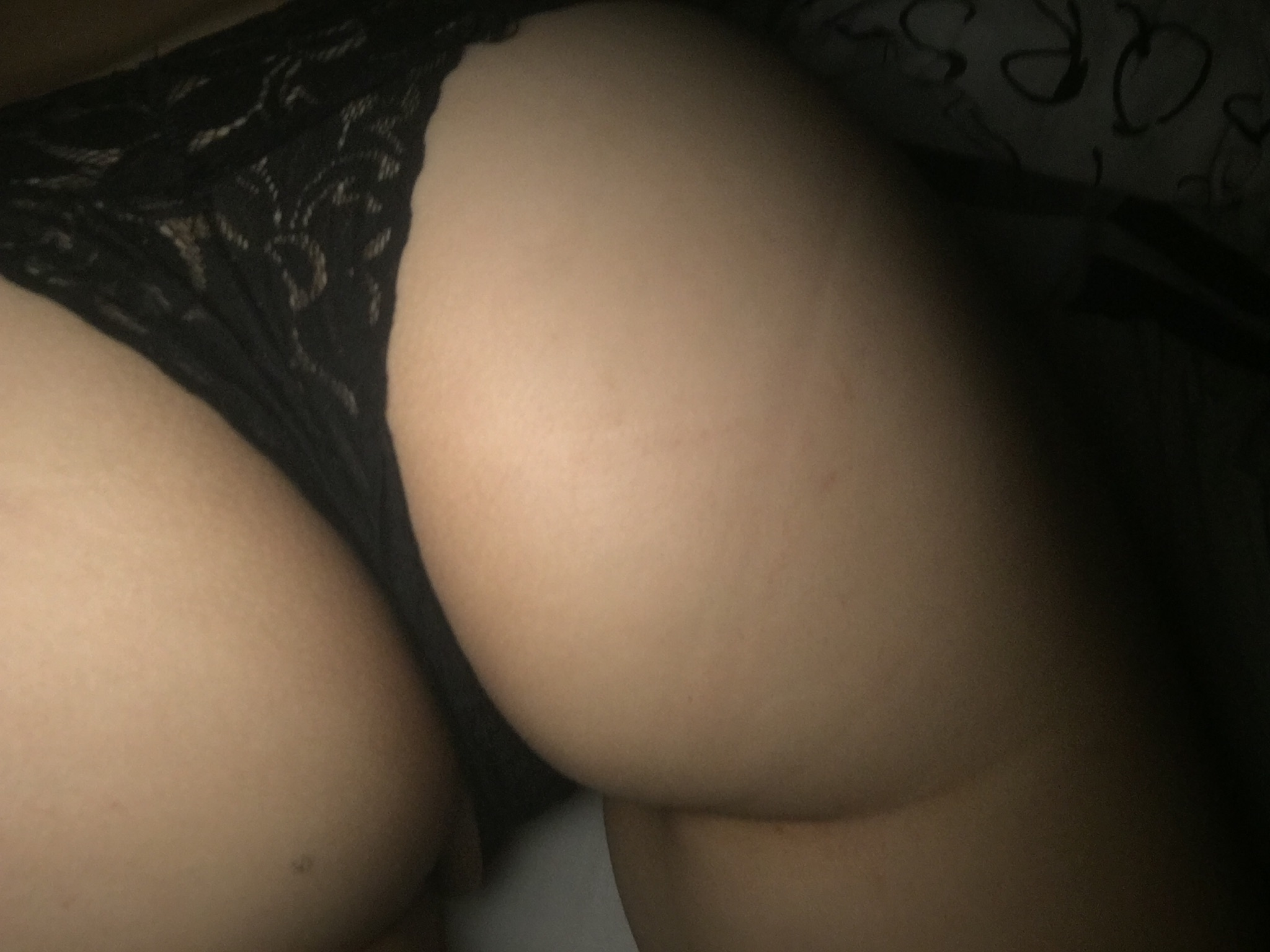
Woman wearing a lace thong

== History ==
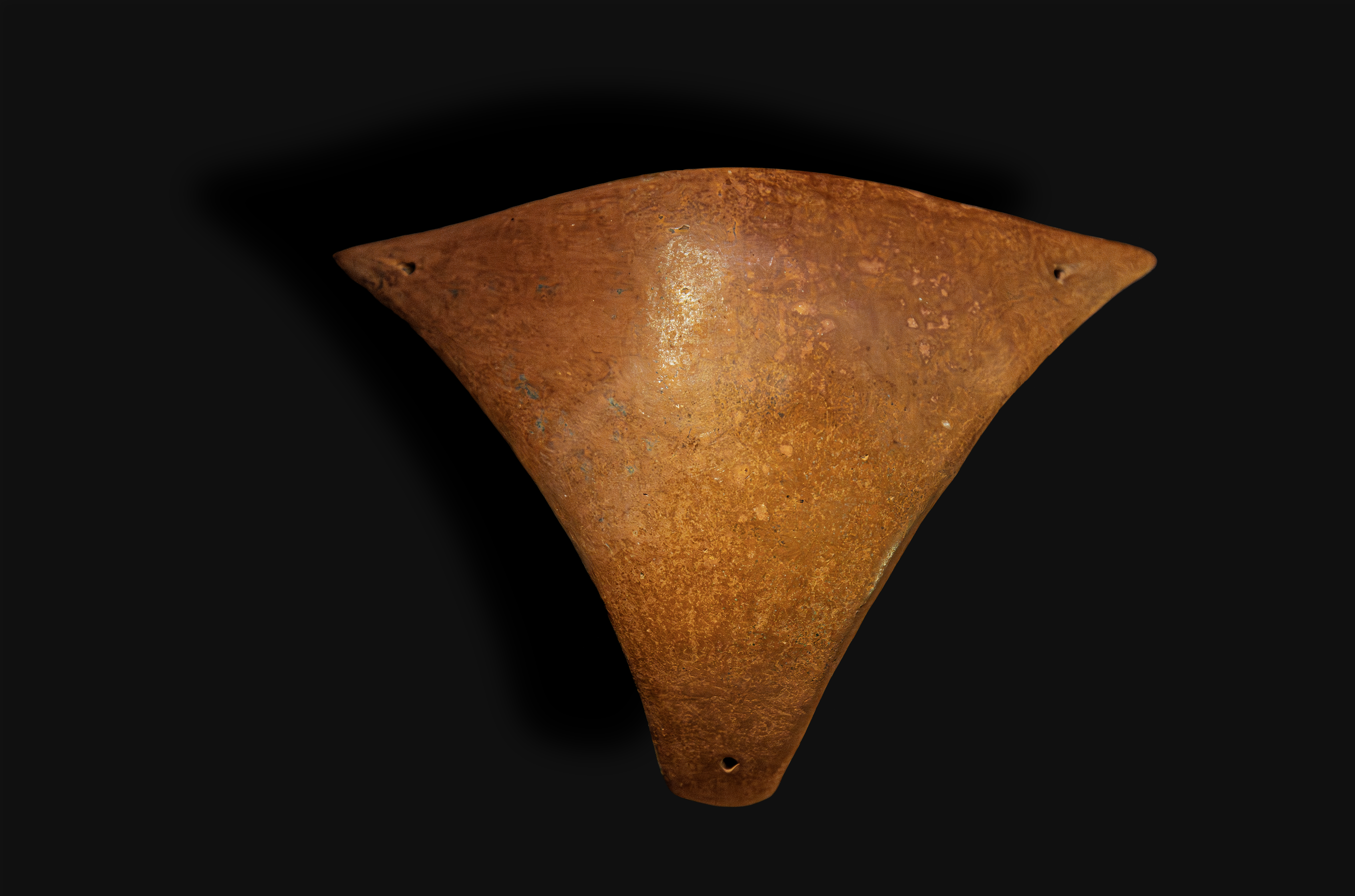
Thong-style genital cover, Marajoara culture, 400–1350 AD, Musée des Amériques

The thong, like its probable predecessor the loincloth, is believed to be one of the earliest forms of human clothing and is also thought to have been worn mostly or exclusively by men. It is thought the thong was probably originally developed to protect, support, or hide the male genitals. The loincloth is probably the earliest form of clothing used by humankind, having originated in the warmer climates of sub-Saharan Africa where clothing was first worn nearly 75,000 years ago. Many tribal peoples, such as some of the Khoisan people of southern Africa, wore thongs for many centuries. Much like the Japanese fundoshi, these early garments were made with the male genitalia in mind.

According to some fashion historians, the first public appearance of the thong in the United States was at the 1939 New York World's Fair. This resulted from Fiorello LaGuardia, the mayor of New York City, ordering the city's nude dancers to cover themselves. Jacques Heim's and Louis Réard's original bikini from 1946 (that introduced the term bikini) had a culotte with a thong back. Fashion designer Rudi Gernreich, who in the mid-1960s created the first topless swimsuit, which he called the monokini, is credited with introducing the modern thong in 1974 when he designed a thong bikini in response to a ban on nude sunbathing by the Los Angeles City Council.

Attitudes toward the wearing of g-strings vary geographically and across societies, as is usual with highly revealing clothing. Prior to its entrance into mainstream fashion, g-strings were primarily worn by exotic dancers. In the modern Western world, g-strings are more commonly marketed towards females but are worn by both sexes. During the 1980s, thongs were worn on stage by pop stars such as Cher and Madonna. By the 1980s, the style (for females) had made its way into most of the Western world; thong swimwear became even more popular through the 1980s due to TV shows such as Baywatch, in which numerous women were recorded wearing thong swimsuits.

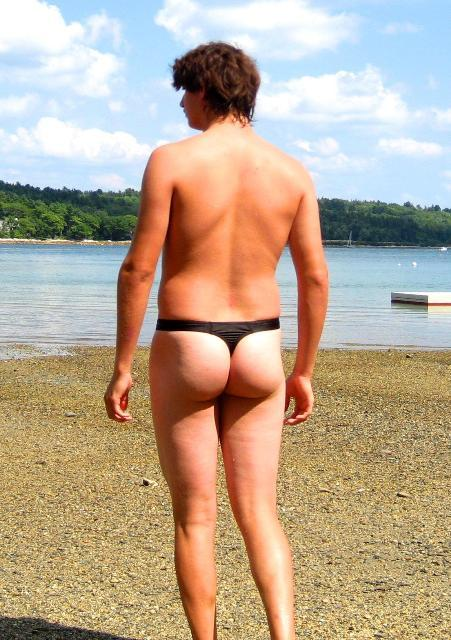
A man in a thong swimsuit

In the 1990s, the thong gained wider popularity in the United States as underwear and as swimwear, especially with women, but also men. In the US and Europe, the wearing of thongs by men was once mainly limited to the dance belt, the posing pouch for bodybuilders and the realm of male strippers. Men's thongs are now more widely available and commonly worn as day-to-day underwear or swimwear, with major retailers such as Kmart and popular fashion brands such as Calvin Klein selling men's thongs. Thongs are not marketed as strongly to men as they are to women; however, in Europe, thongs have been commonplace for many more years both as underwear and swimwear.

In the 2000s, some people wore thongs with low-cut hipsters and deliberately exposed them over the top of their trousers, producing an effect popularly known as a whale tail. This led to many thong designs intended to be worn in this manner, which were adorned with jewels and motifs on the back. In the early-2000s, thongs made up 31% of the women's underwear market. However, in the late-2000s, the exposure of a thong above one's trousers became less popular and the trend turned to the wearing of lower-riding thongs that hardly show above trousers, except when bending or twisting.

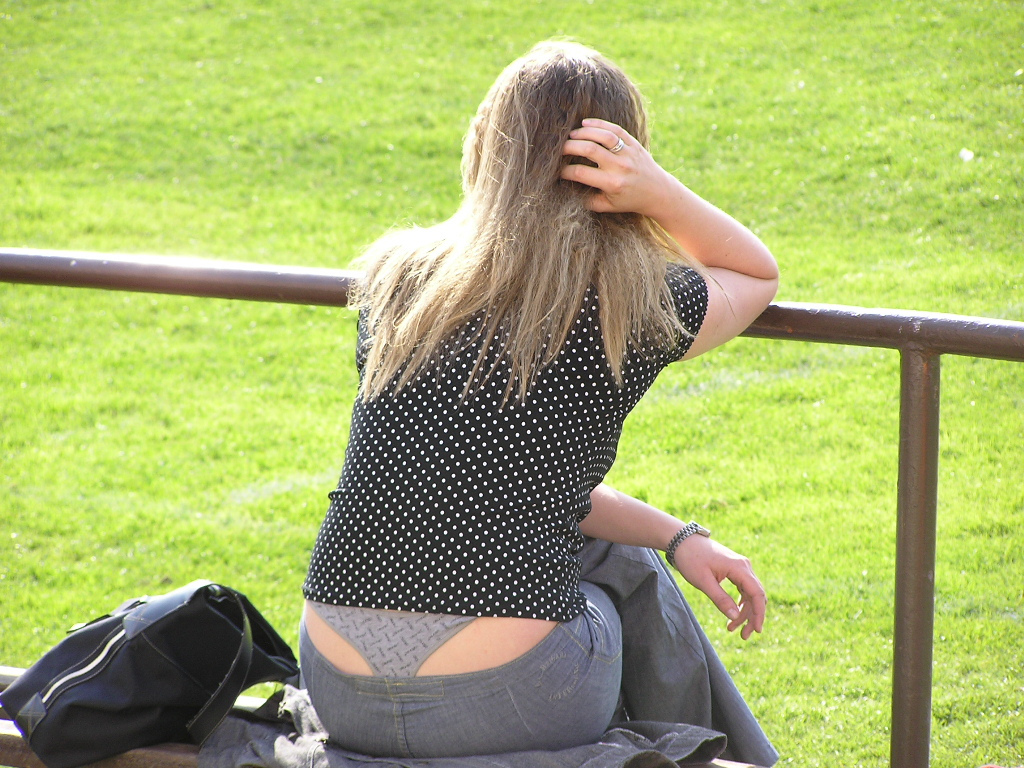
Woman in 2005 revealing a whale tail

Market research in 2011 placed the number of French women who wear thongs as their preferred underwear style at 25%, down by 5% from 2008. By 2016, sales of thongs in the UK were on the decline with Marks & Spencer, a major UK lingerie retailer, reporting that they made up fewer than 10% of knickers sold. In 2022, women's thong sales saw a surge compared to previous years, in part due to a revival of the 2000s trend of the exposed thong popular between Gen Z wearers. Men's thongs also saw renewed interest in part also due to the rising popularity of lingerie for men, with major producers and traditional lingerie makers introducing new products catered to men.

By the mid-2020s thong bikinis had become a popular form of swimwear, produced in a wide variety of sizes and marketed diversely. This development coincided with a popularity in buttock-enhancing workouts in gyms, in the same way that the popularity of low-rise jeans in the 2000s coincided with a popularity in workouts aimed at producing a flat abdomen. Many reasons exist as to why people may choose to wear thong underwear or swimwear, such as prevention of visible panty lines, prevention of underwear "riding up" so one need not pull at one's underwear in public, comfort, fashion consciousness including the feeling of being more adult, and minimization of tan lines.

== Design and variety ==
| Backs | Sides | | |
| Backs | Strap | Tie-side | Strapless |
|---|---|---|---|
| Low coverage | V-string, T-front, G-string | T-back | C-string |
| Medium coverage | Cheeky | | |

Types of thongs include the traditional thong, the G-string, and the C-string. There are a number of intermediate kinds of thongs between full rear coverage and a string rear. As designs become more risqué, there are also types intended to expose genitals as much as they conceal them. Other styles include the Cheeky, V-string, T-front and T-back. The naming of the intermediate styles of thong is debatable, different vendors use the words somewhat interchangeably. Thongs are available in a wide variety of materials, including silk, latex, cotton, microfiber, satin, nylon, lycra/spandex, and lace. There are also novelty designs for both sexes, featuring shapes to conform to the genitals or provide humorous visual effects.

The most significant difference between thongs designed for men and women is the shape of the front part of the garment. Often, but not always, thongs for men will feature a vertical seam to create shape and space for the male genitalia, and the pouch may be made of stretchy material (usually cotton-Lycra or microfiber) for an ergonomic fit. The equivalent section in women's thongs is normally flat and seamless. However, the fabric is usually thicker in the area where it covers the vulva (by incorporating a cotton gusset).

=== G-string ===
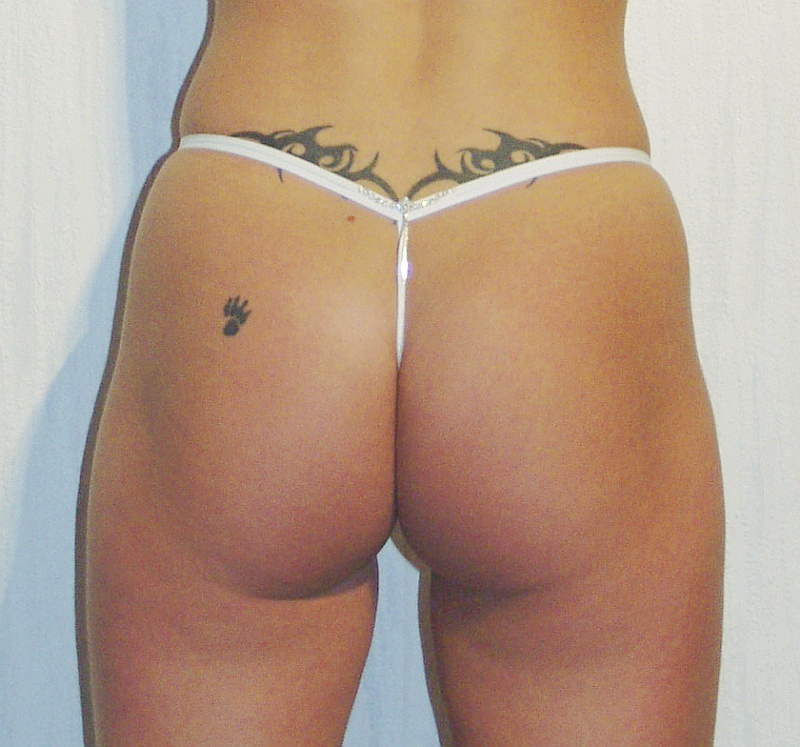
Back-view

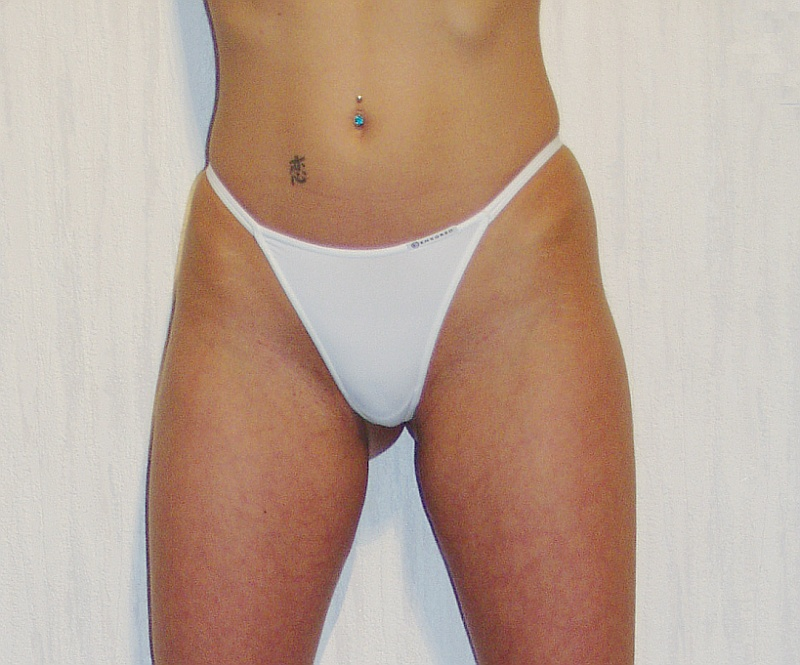
Front-view

The V or G-string style consists of an elastic string (also a narrow piece of cloth, leather, or plastic) that connects the front/pouch and the waistband at back, worn as swimwear or underwear by women and men. Since the mid-1920s, strippers and exotic dancers in the West have been referring to the style of thongs they wore for their performances as G-strings. A g-string may be worn in preference to briefs for avoiding a visible panty line, or to enhance sex-appeal.

==== Etymology ====
The origin of the term G-string is obscure. It may simply stand for 'Gusset' as the G-String is in effect just a gusset on a string. Since the 19th century, the term geestring referred to the string which held the loincloth of American Indians and later referred to the narrow loincloth itself. William Safire in his Ode on a G-String quoted the usage of the word G-string for loincloth by Harper's Magazine 15 years after Beadle's and suggested that the magazine confused the word with the musical term G string (i.e., the string for the G note). Safire also mentions the opinion of linguist Robert Hendrickson that "G" (or "gee") stands for groin, which was a taboo word at the time.

==== History ====
The G-string first appeared in costumes worn by showgirls in Earl Carroll's productions during the Jazz Age. Linguist Robert Hendrickson believes that the g stands for groin. The Oxford English Dictionary reports that the G-string was originally a narrow strip of fabric worn by Indian women. During the Depression, a "G-string" was known as "the gadget". During the 1930s, the "Chicago G-string" gained prominence when worn by performers like Margie Hart. The Chicago area was the home of some of the largest manufacturers of G-strings and it also became the center of the burlesque shows in the United States. In the Tarzan novels of Edgar Rice Burroughs, Tarzan is described as wearing a G-string made of doe or leopard skin.

=== Other variants of women's thongs ===
| Variant | Image | Description |
|---|---|---|
| C-string | noborder | Sometimes described as an "extreme thong", the C-string consists of a small piece of fabric covering the crotch, held in place by a thin piece of curved wire between the buttocks. It has no side straps, instead relying on a flexible internal frame, typically made of wire and with fabric attached to it. The principal aim of the C-string is to avoid a visible panty line under clothing. As beachwear the design also reduces tan lines. Some neo-burlesque performers wear C-strings, revealing them as part of their act. Designs exist for both women and men. Some versions of the C-string are self-adhesive and do not have a wire frame. Instead the crotch cover is connected to a narrow strip of material passing through the intergluteal cleft and a small anchoring pad above the sacrum. |
| Cheeky | noborder | A more conservative style called a cheeky covers a little more area, but exposes the lower portion of the buttocks. Some cheekies are used as undergarments while others function as bikini bottoms. |
| T-front | noborder | A type of T-string in which the string reaches also the front part. It provides no coverage while still maintaining the basic hygienic underwear functions. Usually it is built by strings only, sometimes with more fabric or lace around the waist. Certain designs cover the string with pearls for purposes of decoration and stimulation. |
| V-string | noborder | A type of G-string, introduced by Victoria's Secret and trademarked by the company in 1998. The string is connected to the waistband by a triangle that is just above the buttocks. The string connects with the waistband directly to form a "V" shape at back. |

=== Other variants of men's thongs ===
| Variant | Description | Image |
|---|---|---|
| Kaupinam | A traditional thong worn in India, by some men as a loincloth or underclothing. It is made up of rectangular strip of cotton cloth which is used to cover the genitals with the help of the strings connected to the four ends of the cloth for binding it around the waist of the wearer. It is used by wrestlers in the game of Kushti or traditional Indian wrestling in the Akhara (wrestling ring) and also during practice sessions and training. | noborder |
| Fundoshi | A traditional Japanese undergarment for adult males and females, made from a length of cotton. Before World War II, the fundoshi was the main form of underwear for Japanese adult males and females. However, it fell out of use quickly after the war with the introduction of new underwear and panties to the Japanese market, such as briefs and trunks. Nowadays, the fundoshi is mainly used not as underwear but as festival (matsuri) clothing at Hadaka Matsuri or, sometimes, as swimwear. There are many other varieties of fundoshi as the variations on the principle of a loincloth are almost infinite. For example, the mokko-fundoshi (literally "earth-basket loincloth" because it looks like the traditional baskets used in construction) is made like the etchyuu-fundoshi but without a front apron; the cloth is secured to the belt to make a bikini effect. The kuro-neko fundoshi (literally "black cat fundoshi") is like the mokko-fundoshi except that the portion that passes from front to back is tailored to create a thong effect. | noborder |
| Jockstrap | An undergarment designed for supporting the male genitalia during sports or other vigorous physical activity. It was created by Chicago sporting goods company Sharp & Smith in 1874. Technically it is not a thong, as there is no narrow strap that passes up between the buttocks. A jockstrap consists of a waistband (usually elastic) with a support pouch for the genitalia and two elastic straps affixed to the base of the pouch and to the left and right sides of the waistband at the hip. The pouch, in some varieties, may be fitted with a pocket to hold an impact resistant cup to protect the testicles and/or the penis from injury. Also known as a jock, jock strap, strap, supporter, or athletic supporter. | noborder |
| Slingshot | A type of strapless undergarment based on the thong and the jockstrap consisting of an elastic waistband with an elastic pouch to hold the male genitalia from the front, without a backstrap or any back coverage. The garment is also referred to as a jock sock or a strapless or backless pouch. | |
| Dance belt | A type of thong designed to be used in the same manner as an athletic supporter, but for male dancers (especially in ballet). Its purpose is to protect and support the dancer during dance activities without being seen through outer garments, such as tights, leotards, gym leggings, or shorts. Thongs tend to offer better support for the male anatomy than do other underwear styles (as well as eliminating contact between the genitals and inner thighs), which is one of the reasons why men and boys may choose to wear them. | noborder |

== Controversy ==
As thongs pass between the buttocks and, in women, may be in close contact with the anus and labia, concerns have been raised that they may become damp and act as a conduit for germ transfer, increasing the probability that the wearer may develop urinary tract infections, such as cystitis. However, research suggests that wearing thong underwear does not have a statistically significant effect on the occurrence of bacterial vaginosis or yeast infection.

In 2002, a female high school vice principal in San Diego, California, physically checked up to 100 female students' underwear as they entered the school for a dance, with or without student permission, causing an uproar among students and some parents and eliciting an investigation by the school into the vice principal's conduct. In her defense, the vice principal said the checks were for student safety and not specifically because of the wearing of thongs.

The sale of thongs for girls aged 10–16 by US retailer Abercrombie & Fitch led to an email and telephone campaign against the company. British retailer Argos was criticized for selling G-strings for girls aged nine, and a primary school head teacher in Britain voiced concerns that pupils aged 10–11 were wearing thong underwear to school.

Thong swimsuits are banned or strongly discouraged in some places, including some Muslim countries. Areas in the United States with similar bans include such locations as Myrtle Beach, South Carolina, Kure Beach, North Carolina, and Brevard County, Florida.

== See also ==
- Perizoma
- Sportswear
- "Thong Song"
- Whale Tail
