= Panty line =

Clothing design element

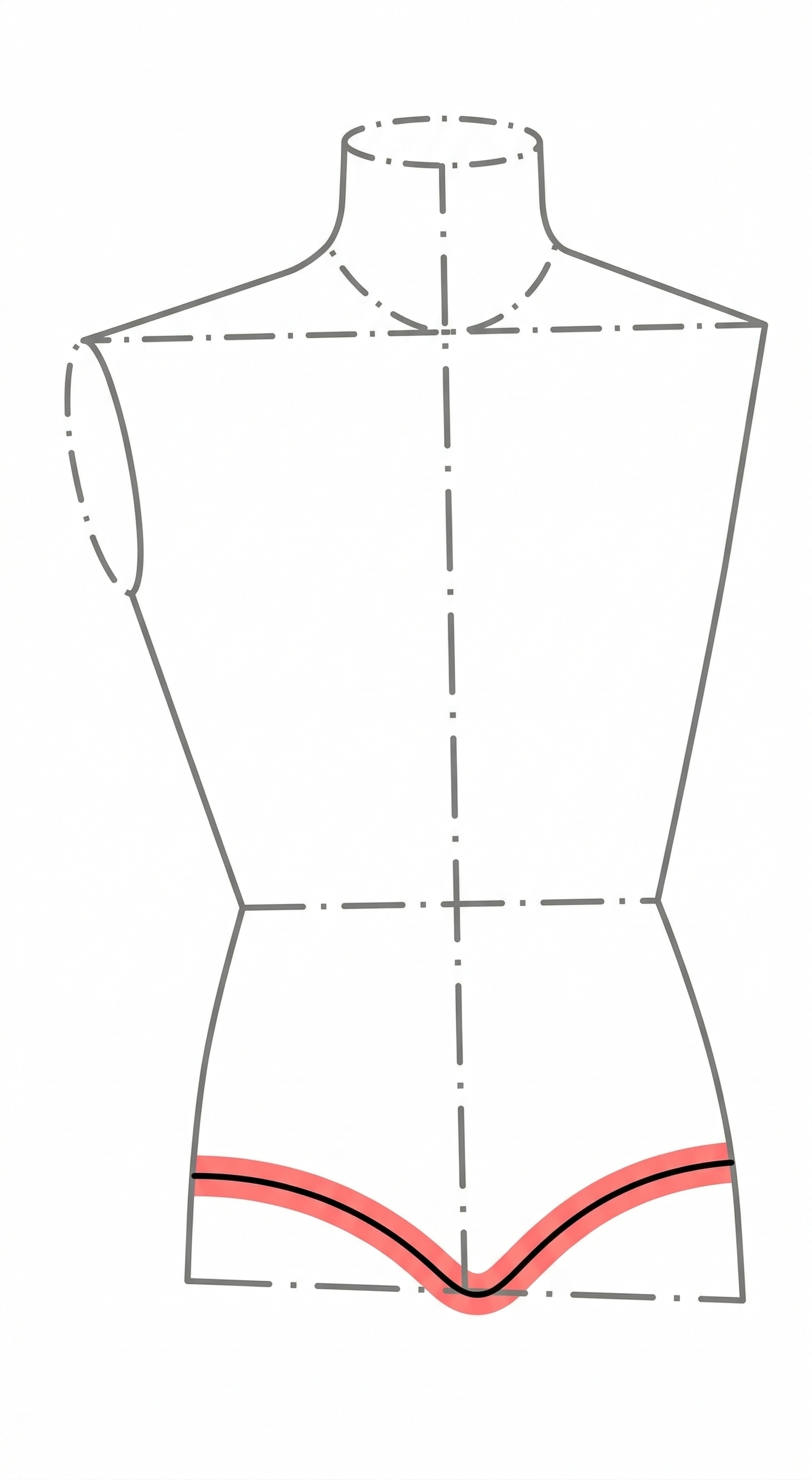
Panty lines on a croquis of a torso

In clothing design, a panty line on a human body goes at an angle from the high hip down to the crotch. It is used as a reference line, for example, a babydoll can end either below or above the panty line (the latter option allows the companies to market a matching set with panties). The term is also used for the edge of the panties, in particular when it is visible through the outer garment.

== Visible panty line ==
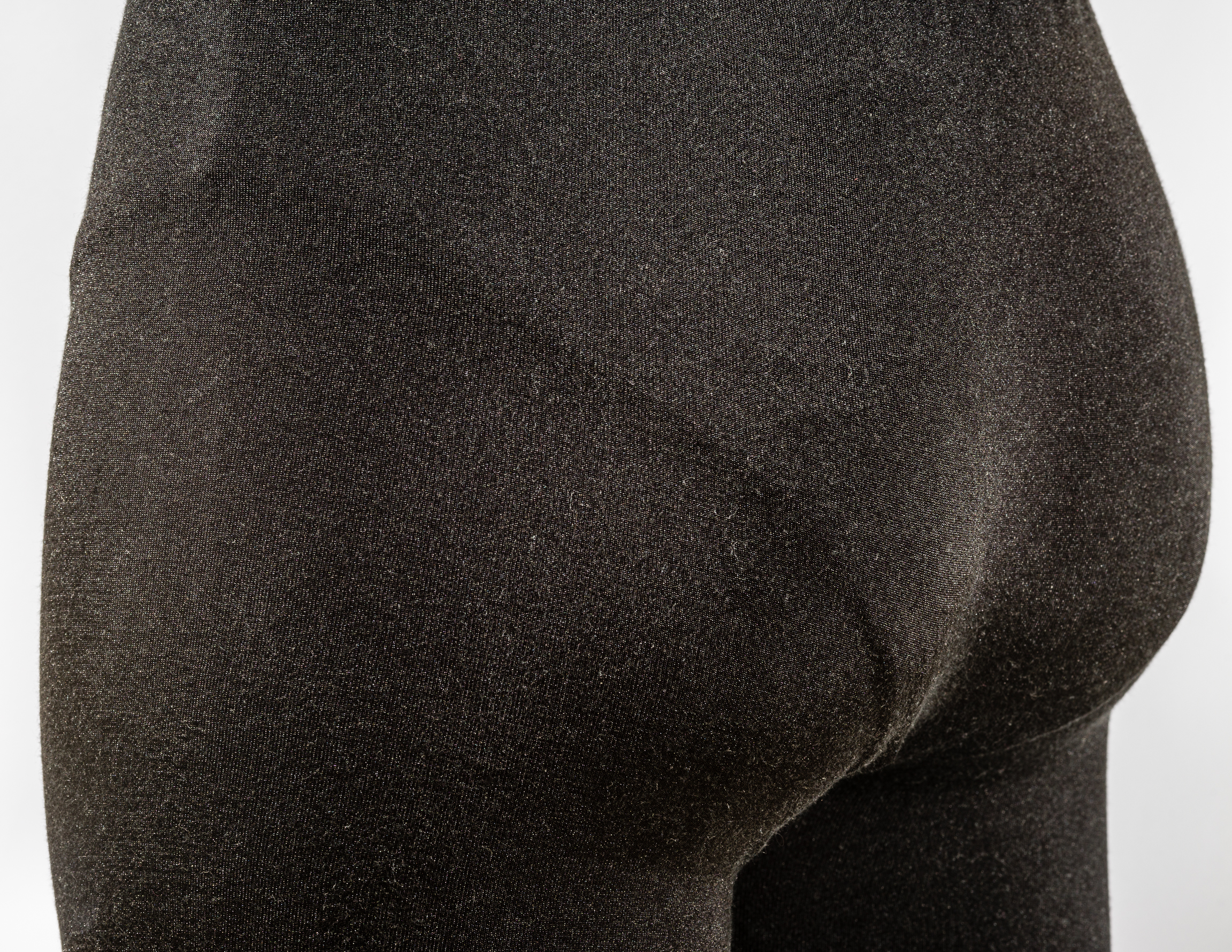
Visible panty line as a ridge underneath seamless leggings, shown on a plastic torso

A visible panty line (also slang VPL) is the situation when the outline of a woman's panties is visible through the outer clothing. The underwear may be seen as a ridge or depression in the clothes, or as a result of the clothing material being sufficiently clingy or transparent.

World War II saw US women entering factories to help the war effort, in the process switching to blue jeans outfits, and puzzled about the proper undergarments for the new clothes. The garment industry had figured out the new opportunity, and in 1943 Vogue ran a piece promoting the rayon jersey underpants with "nonexistent looks", boldly declaring the wash-and-wear barely visible pieces to be part of "simplification [that] is a twentieth-century word". The concern about VPL was born, and never extinguished since, as solutions kept creating new issues (compare thongs with the corresponding "whale tail"). Absence of visible panty line has been an important point in promotions and it was even a matter of focus group research on the proper tagline involving (absence of) panty lines. Sara Blakely built her Spanx company after experiencing the panty line problem herself.

The origin of the term "VPL" is probably traced to barracks humor, the term VPL for 'visible panty line' as a mockery of overused bureaucratic initialisms, coined in an analogy with water line. (Note: Reporter David Halberstam, a Pulitzer Prize winner for his reports on the Vietnam War, in his 1967 novel about the war One Very Hot Day (Reprinted in 1984 with ISBN 978-0-446-32111-2) writes: "They all wore white dresses, that was the prescribed legal uniform, but they wore them so short and tight, that was almost obscene. (So tight that the panty lines could always be seen, and the helicopter pilots, who were insane for military abbreviations, had invented the phrase VPL, for Visible Panty Line).") The New Partridge Dictionary of Slang and Unconventional English claims that the phrase was popularized by Woody Allen's 1977 comedy film Annie Hall.

Visible panty lines are considered to be things that are "showing, and ... don't look good". There are a number of ways to avoid panty lines: thick or textured fabrics, using "camouflaging" print, pantyhose, or boy shorts. Hollywood costume designer Freer declares VPL a "number one undergarments problem" she is being asked to solve and recommends few solutions: stop worrying (as one actress stated, "I want people to know I'm wearing underwear"), wear either less-tight or more full-coverage garment.

Since the beginning of the 21st century, female celebrities started to wear visible underwear. Year 2023 in particular saw the rapid increase of sheer dresses with just a very visible pair of briefs underneath (at the Saint Laurent 2023 spring show a third of the "looks" were following this trend). Fashion historian Chrisman-Campbell attributes this tendency to the need for celebrities to be watched and photographed that is causing racier fashion to proliferate. As a result, a deliberately visible panty line is turning to be more mainstream.

== See also ==
- Bikini line
