= Lingerie =

Women's underwear and sleepwear

Duolian Lingerie in Taiwanese AV Actress (TBA)

Lingerie (UK: /ˈlæ̃ʒəri, ˈlɒn-/, US: /ˌlɒnʒəˈreɪ, ˌlænʒəˈriː/, French: [lɛ̃ʒʁi]) is a category of clothing including underwear (mainly bras), sleepwear, and lightweight robes. The choice of the word is often motivated by an intention to imply that the garments are alluring, fashionable, or both. In a 2015 US survey, 75% of women reported having worn "sexy lingerie" in their lifetime. In 2017, a survey found 4% of men had worn male lingerie in their lifetime.

Lingerie is made of lightweight, stretchy, smooth, sheer or decorative fabrics such as silk, satin, spandex, charmeuse, chiffon, or (especially and traditionally) lace. These fabrics can be made of various natural fibres like silk, cotton or of various synthetic fibres such as polyester or nylon.

== Etymology ==
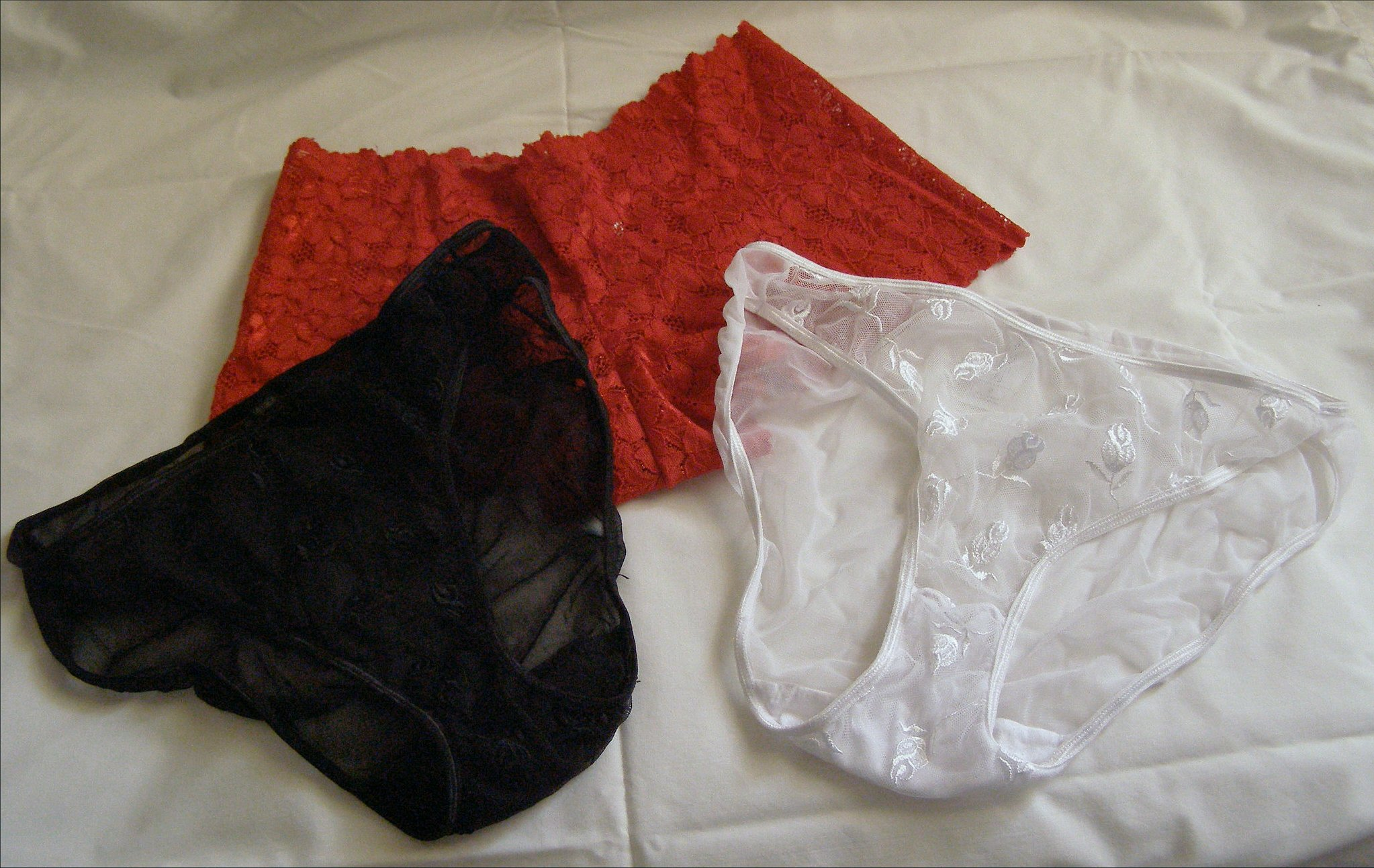
Women's panties

The word lingerie is a word taken directly from the French language, meaning undergarments, and used exclusively for more lightweight items of female underwear. The French word in its original form derives from the French word linge, meaning "linen" or "clothes". Informal usage suggests visually appealing or even erotic clothing. Although most lingerie is designed to be worn by women, some manufacturers also design lingerie for men.

== History ==
=== 19th century origins ===
The concept of lingerie as a visually appealing undergarment was developed during the late nineteenth century. Lady Duff-Gordon of Lucile was a pioneer in developing lingerie that freed women from more restrictive corsets. Before the invention of crinoline, women's underwear was often very large and bulky.

=== 20th century ===
Through the first half of the 20th century, women wore underwear for three primary reasons, to alter their outward shape (first with corsets and later with girdles or bras), for hygienic reasons and for modesty. During the late 19th century, corsets became smaller, less bulky and more constricting and were gradually supplanted by the brassiere, first patented in the 20th century by Caresse Crosby.

During the First World War, women found themselves filling in men's work roles, creating a demand for more practical underwear. Manufacturers began to use lighter and more breathable fabrics. In 1935, bras were updated with padded cups to flatter small breasts and three years later underwire bras were introduced that gave a protruding bustline. There was also a return to a small waist achieved with girdles. The ideal woman of the 1940s was thin, but had curvaceous hips and breasts that were pointy and shapely.

In the 1960s, the female silhouette was liberated along with social mores; this era's new "ideal" consisted of adolescent breasts, slim hips, and extreme thinness. André Courrèges was the first to make a fashion statement out of the youth culture when his 1965 collection presented androgynous figures and the image of a modern woman comfortable with her own body.

As the 20th century progressed, underwear became smaller and more form fitting. In the 1960s, lingerie manufacturers such as Frederick's of Hollywood began to glamorise lingerie. The rise of Victoria's Secret in the 1980s further transformed lingerie from a purely functional item into a fashion category, with the company's fashion shows becoming major cultural events.

=== 21st century ===
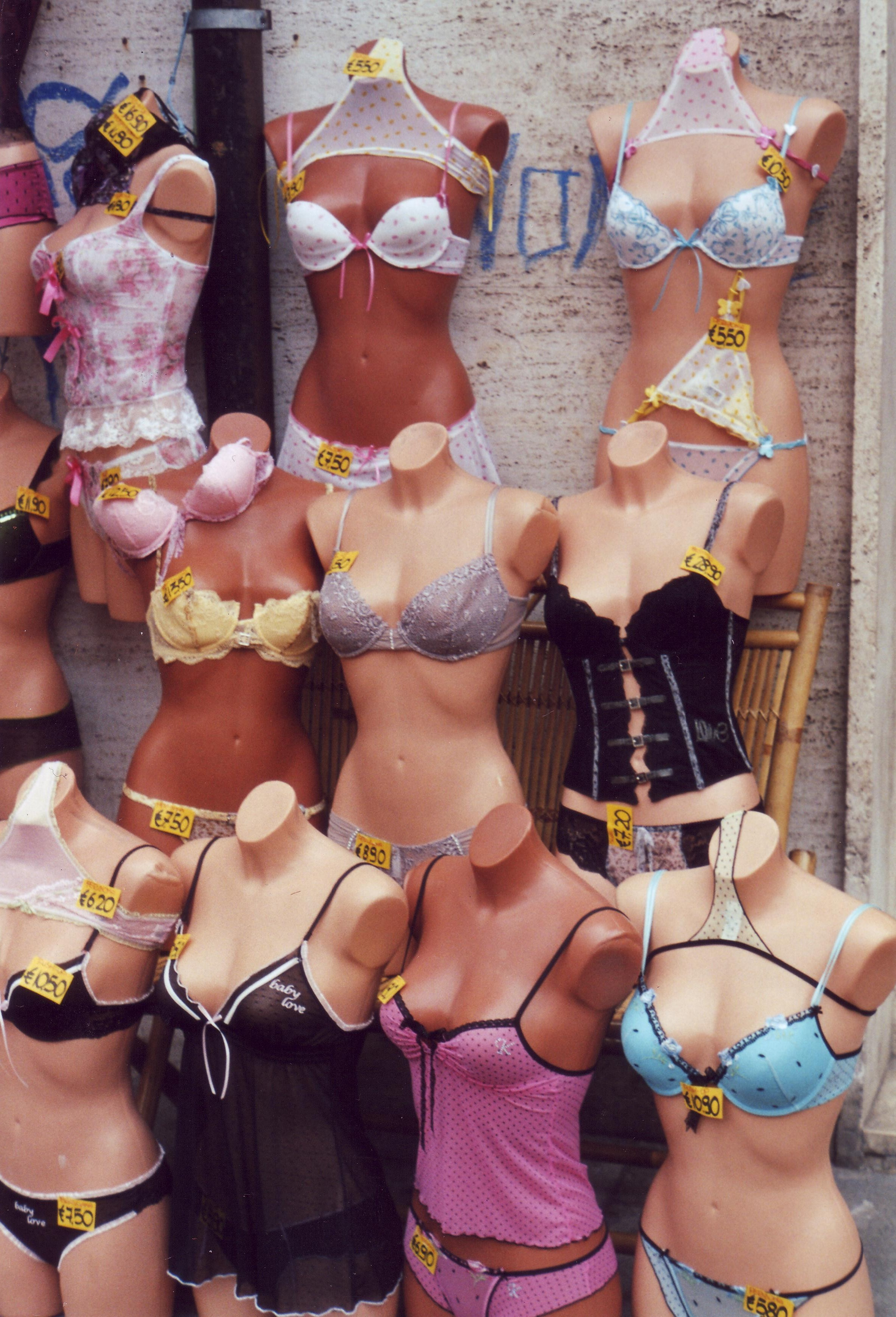
Lingerie displayed on women's mannequins

The lingerie industry expanded in the 21st century with designs that doubled as outerwear. This is known by the French term "dessous-dessus", meaning something akin to innerwear as outerwear. The 2010s and 2020s featured a growing emphasis on inclusivity and body positivity, with brands expanding size ranges and diversifying marketing imagery. Rihanna's Savage X Fenty brand, launched in 2018, was widely credited with accelerating this shift by featuring models of various body types, ethnicities, and gender identities in its fashion shows.

== Lingerie as outerwear ==
The practice of wearing lingerie-inspired garments as visible outerwear has been a recurring fashion trend since the late 20th century. Madonna popularised the visible corset as outerwear during her Blond Ambition World Tour in 1990, wearing a cone bra designed by Jean Paul Gaultier. This moment is widely cited as a turning point for lingerie's visibility in mainstream fashion.

During the 2010s and 2020s, bralettes, corsets, and bodysuits became common outerwear pieces. The "underwear as outerwear" trend was regularly featured in collections by designers including Alexander McQueen, Dolce & Gabbana, and Versace. Street style photography from fashion weeks frequently documented the adoption of lingerie elements, bustier tops, visible garter belts, and sheer layering, as part of everyday fashion.

== Body chains and intimate jewellery ==
The intersection of lingerie and body piercing jewelry has become an increasingly visible category in fashion. Body chains, decorative chains worn across the torso, waist, or thighs, are often styled as alternatives to or complements for traditional lingerie.

=== History ===
Body adornment with chains and draped jewellery has roots in ancient India, Egypt, and the Middle East, where waist chains (known as kamarband in South Asia) were worn by women as both decorative and symbolic accessories. In ancient Mesopotamia and Egypt, draped body chains and belly chains were associated with fertility, status, and divine protection.

In Western fashion, body chains gained mainstream attention in the early 2010s, influenced by music festival culture and Coachella street style. Celebrities including Rihanna, Beyoncé, and Kendall Jenner were photographed wearing body chains over swimwear and lingerie, contributing to the accessory's rise in mainstream fashion.

=== Types ===
Contemporary body chain styles used in lingerie and intimate fashion contexts include:

- Belly chain, a decorative chain worn around the waist or hips, often featuring pendants or layered strands. In South Asian cultures, the waist chain (kamarbandh) remains a significant bridal and ceremonial accessory.
- Torso chain (harness chain), chains draped across the chest and shoulders, resembling the silhouette of a halter top or bralette.
- Thigh chain, a chain worn around the upper thigh, sometimes connected to a waist chain, functioning as a garter alternative.
- Shoulder chain, a chain draped across the shoulders, often extending down the back and chest.

=== Chainmail and metal lingerie ===
Chainmail-inspired garments have appeared periodically in high fashion as a form of decorative intimate wear. Designer Paco Rabanne was among the first to incorporate chain mail and metal disc construction into fashion garments during the 1960s, creating dresses and tops, including the disc dress, from linked metal pieces. In the 2020s, chainmail tops, bralettes, and skirts made from aluminium or stainless steel rings became popular in festival fashion and nightlife contexts.

== Harnesses in fashion ==
Fashion harnesses, decorative strapped garments typically made from real leather, artificial leather, or elastic webbing, emerged as a crossover between fetish fashion and mainstream lingerie during the 2010s. Unlike functional harnesses used in climbing or industrial settings, fashion harnesses are purely decorative and are worn over or in place of conventional lingerie and clothing.

=== Subcultural origins ===
The adoption of harnesses as fashion items originates to the BDSM and leather subculture communities of the 1970s and 1980s, where leather harnesses served as both identity signifiers and aesthetic choices. The punk and goth subcultures of the 1980s incorporated harness-like strapping into their aesthetics, bridging the gap between subcultural and mainstream fashion.

=== Mainstream adoption ===
By the mid-2010s, fashion harnesses appeared in runway collections by Zana Bayne, Chromat, and other designers, as well as in performances by pop artists including Lady Gaga, Beyoncé, and Billie Eilish. Retailers began marketing harnesses alongside traditional lingerie, positioning them as "statement lingerie" or "body accessories". The category expanded to include body harnesses, leg harnesses, and chest harnesses available in leather, lace, elastic, and chain variants. The growth of e-commerce further accelerated the market, with independent online retailers specialising in alternative fashion and body accessories offering harness styles ranging from minimalist elastic designs to elaborate leather cage constructions.

== Cultural significance ==
=== Feminism and empowerment ===
The relationship between lingerie and feminism has been complex and evolving. While second-wave feminism in the 1960s and 1970s critiqued lingerie as a tool of objectification, symbolised by the widely reported (but largely mythical) bra-burning protests at the 1968 Miss America protest, later third-wave feminism and fourth-wave feminism reframed lingerie as a potential vehicle for female empowerment and self-expression.

Scholars have noted that the 21st-century lingerie market increasingly appeals to the concept of women purchasing lingerie for their own pleasure rather than for the male gaze.

=== Festival and rave culture ===
Lingerie and lingerie-adjacent garments, including bralettes, body chains, harnesses, and sheer bodysuits, have become central to the fashion of electronic dance music (EDM) festivals such as Coachella, Burning Man, Tomorrowland, and Electric Daisy Carnival. The festival context blurs the boundary between underwear and outerwear, with attendees combining intimate apparel with accessories such as body glitter, temporary tattoos, and statement jewellery. Online retailers catering to the festival fashion market have documented the growing demand for body chains, harnesses, and chainmail garments as staple festival attire.

=== Subculture and alternative fashion ===
Lingerie has played a significant role in various subcultures and alternative fashion movements. In goth fashion, black lace lingerie elements are frequently incorporated into outerwear ensembles. The cyberpunk and cybergoth aesthetics incorporate PVC, latex, and metallic lingerie-inspired garments. In Japanese street fashion, the Lolita and visual kei subcultures incorporate petticoats, corsets, and other historical lingerie items into complex layered outfits.

== Market structure ==
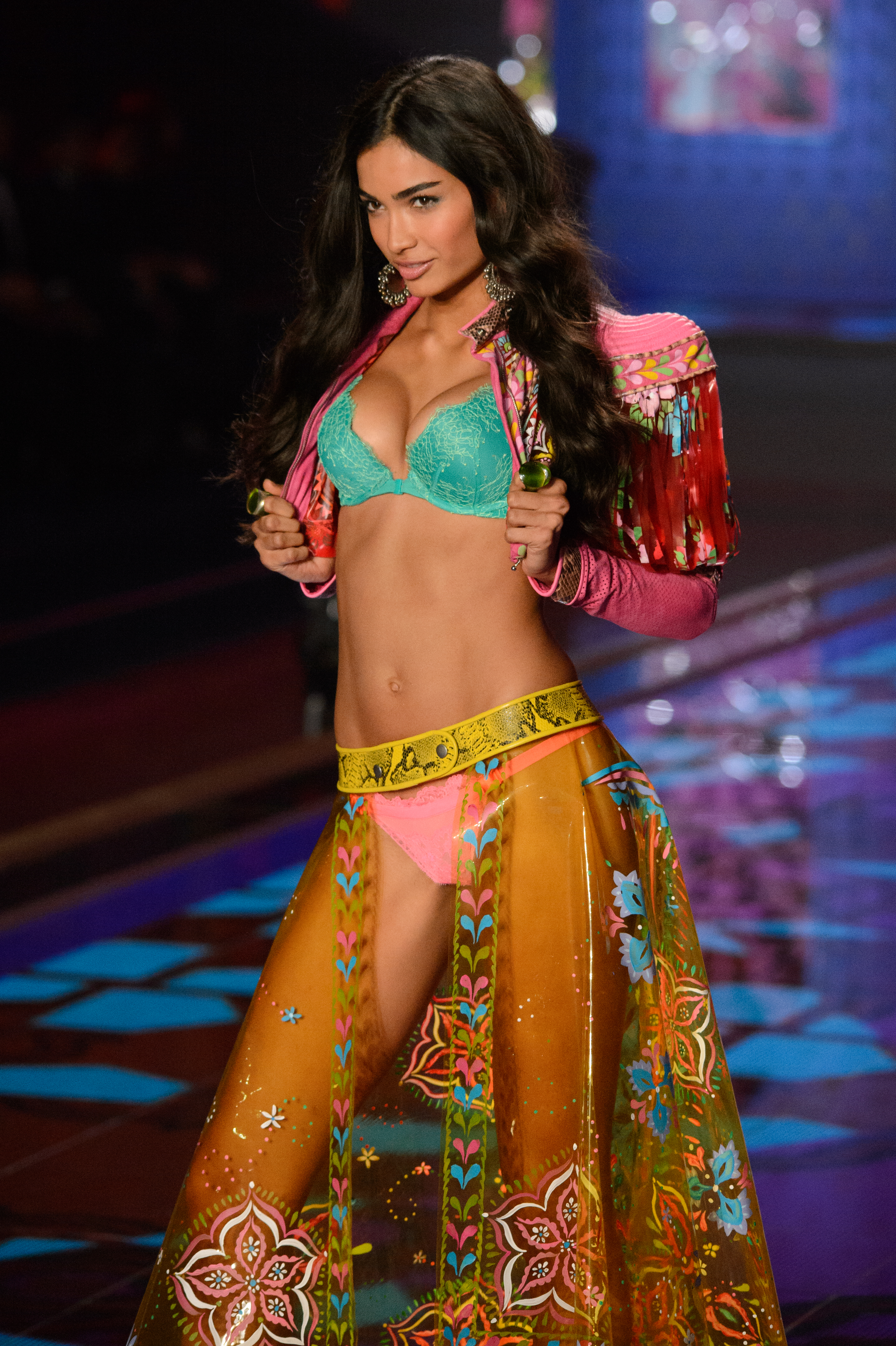
Kelly Gale at the Victoria's Secret Fashion Show 2014

The global lingerie market in 2003 was estimated at $29 billion, while in 2005, bras accounted for 56 percent of the lingerie market and briefs represented 29 percent. The largest lingerie retailer in the United States, Victoria's Secret, operates almost exclusively in North America, but the European market is fragmented, with Triumph International and DB Apparel predominant. Also prominent are French lingerie houses, including Chantelle and Aubade.

By 2022, the global lingerie market was valued at approximately $82 billion and was projected to reach $130 billion by 2030, driven by e-commerce growth, increasing demand for inclusive sizing, and the expansion of direct-to-consumer brands.

In March 2020, The Guardian reported a trend for male lingerie on the catwalk and predictions as to the likelihood of it successfully extending to the high street fashion stores.

=== Sustainability ===
The 2020s saw growing consumer and industry interest in sustainable lingerie, with brands introducing garments made from organic cotton, recycled polyester, and lyocell. The movement was influenced by broader concerns about the environmental impact of fashion and the high volume of textile waste generated by fast fashion lingerie.

== Legality ==
The legality of lingerie varies by jurisdiction. The Iranian regime regularly bans vendors who procure and sell imported lingerie dresses. In some countries, laws restrict the public display of lingerie in shop windows or advertisements, while in others, lingerie advertising is subject to broadcasting standards regarding sexual content.

== Typology ==
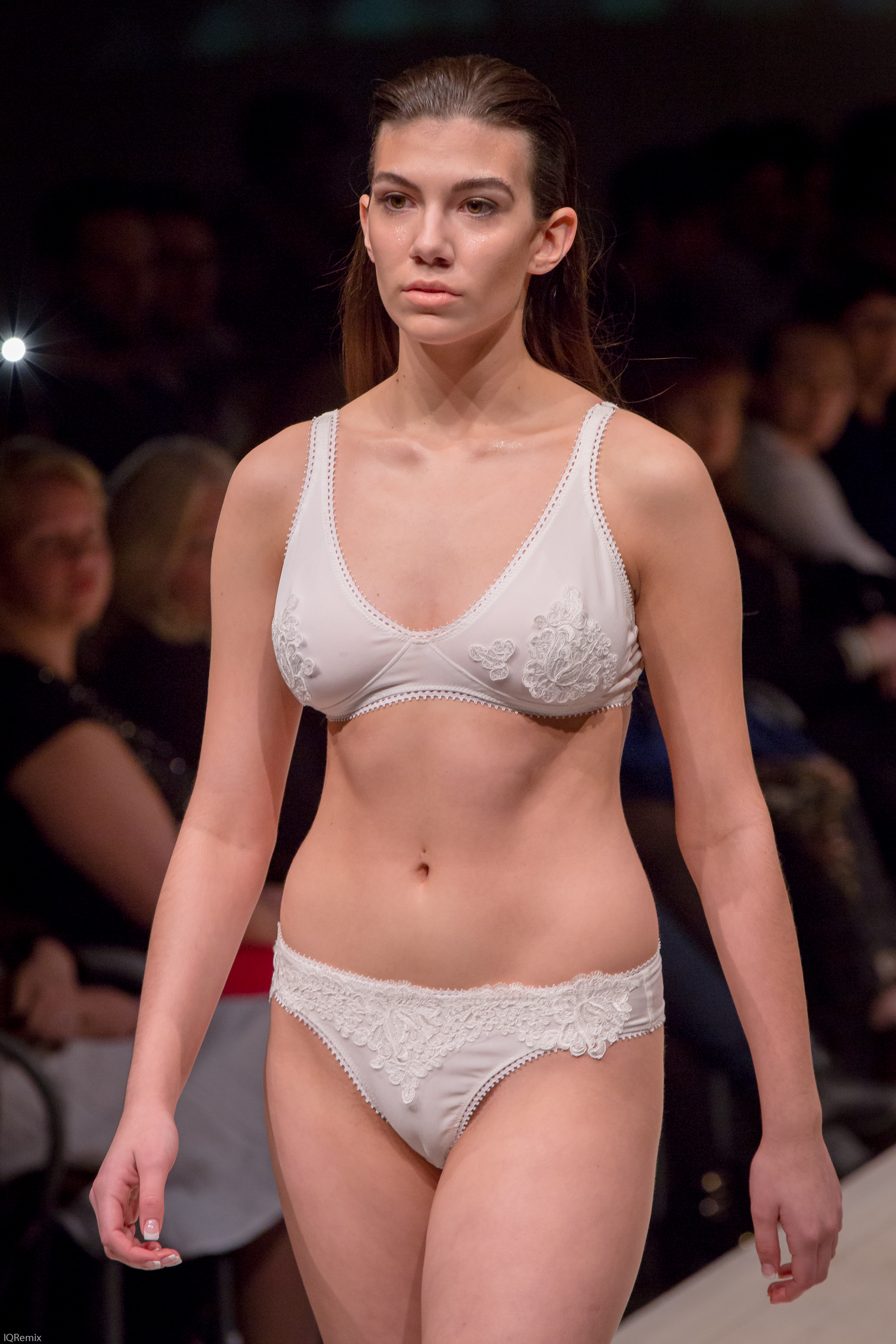
Model wearing lingerie at a fashion show

=== Upper body ===
- Babydoll, a short nightgown, or negligee, intended as nightwear for women. A shorter style, it is often worn with panties. Babydolls are typically loose-fitting with an empire waist and thin straps.
- Basque, a tight, form-fitting bodice or coat.
- Bodice, covers the body from the neck to the waist. Bodices are often low cut in the front and high in the back, and are often connected with laces or hooks. Bodices may also be reinforced with steel or bone to provide greater breast support.
- Bra, or brassiere, a close-fitting garment that is worn to help lift and support a woman's breasts.
- Bralette, an unlined, unstructured bra typically without underwire or padding, popular as both underwear and outerwear since the 2010s.
- Bustier, a form fitting garment used to extend the breasts and to shape the waist.
- Camisole, sleeveless and covering the top part of the body. Camisoles are typically constructed of light materials and feature thin spaghetti straps.
- Corset, a bodice worn to mould and shape the torso. This effect is typically achieved through boning, either of bone or steel.
- Corselet, or merry widow, combined brassiere and girdle. The corselet is considered to be a type of foundation garment, and the modern corselet is most commonly known as a shaping slip.

=== Lower body ===
- Bloomers, baggy underwear that extends to just below or above the knee. Bloomers were worn for several decades during the first part of the 20th century, but had declined in popularity since then.
- G-string, or thong, a type of panty, characterised by a narrow piece of cloth that is worn between the buttocks and is attached to a band around the hips. A G-string or thong may be worn as a bikini bottom or as underwear.
- Garter/Garter belt/Suspender belt, used to keep stockings up.
- Girdle, a type of foundation garment. Historically, the girdle extended from the waist to the upper thigh, though modern styles more closely resemble a tight pair of athletic shorts.
- Panties or knickers, a generic term for underwear covering the genitals and sometimes buttocks that come in all shapes, fabrics and colours, offering varying degrees of coverage.
- Petticoat, an underskirt. Petticoats were prominent throughout the 16th to 20th centuries. In recent years, petticoats are typically worn to add fullness to skirts in the Gothic and Lolita subcultures.
- Pettipants, a type of bloomer featuring ruffles, resembling petticoats. Pettipants are most commonly worn by square dancers and people participating in historical reenactment.
- Tanga, a type of panty featuring full back and front coverage, but string-like sides that are typically thicker than those found on a string bikini.
- Tap pants, a type of short typically made of lace, silk or satin.

=== Full body ===
- Bodystocking, a unitard. Bodystockings may be worn over the torso, or they may be worn over the thighs and abdomen.
- Bodysuit, a one-piece form-fitting or skin-tight garment that covers the torso and the crotch. The design of a basic bodysuit is similar to a one-piece swimsuit and a leotard, though the materials may vary.
- Chemise, a one-piece undergarment that is the same in shape as a straight-hanging sleeveless dress. It is similar to the babydoll, but it is fitted more closely around the hips.
- Teddy, an undergarment that resembles the shape of a one-piece bathing suit because it is typically sleeveless, and sometimes even strapless.

=== Sleepwear ===
- Negligee, a dressing gown. It is usually floor length, though it can be knee length as well.
- Nightgown, or nightie, a loosely hanging item of nightwear, may vary from hip-length (babydoll) to floor-length (peignoir).
- Nightshirt, a shirt meant to be worn while sleeping. It is usually longer and looser than the average T-shirt, and it is typically made of softer material.

=== Hosiery ===
- Hosiery, close-fitting, elastic garments that cover the feet and legs, including stockings, tights, and thigh-highs.

=== Body jewellery and accessories ===
- Body chain, decorative chains worn across the torso, often styled as lingerie alternatives or accessories.
- Belly chain, or waist chain, a chain worn around the waist or hips, often featuring pendants or layered strands.
- Thigh chain, a chain worn around the upper thigh, sometimes connected to a waist chain, functioning as a garter alternative.
- Body harness, a decorative strapped garment typically made from leather or elastic webbing, worn over or in place of conventional lingerie.

== See also ==
- Fetish fashion
- Corset
- List of bra designs
- List of lingerie brands
- Ring, slide and hook
- Underwear as outerwear
- Underwear fetishism
- Body piercing
- Boudoir photography

== Bibliography ==
- Carter, Alison J. (1992). Underwear: The Fashion History. London: Batsford Books. ISBN 0-7134-6222-1.
- Cox, Caroline (2000). Lingerie: A Lexicon of Style. London: Scriptum Editions. ISBN 1-902686-08-X.
- Hill, Colleen (2014). Exposed: A History of Lingerie. New Haven, CT: Yale University Press. ISBN 978-0-300-20886-3.
- Steele, Valerie (1996). Fetish: Fashion, Sex and Power. Oxford University Press. ISBN 978-0-19-511579-6.
- Pedersen, Stephanie (2004). Bra: A Thousand Years of Style, Support and Seduction. David & Charles. ISBN 978-0-7153-2067-9.
