= Basque (clothing) =

Item of women's apparel

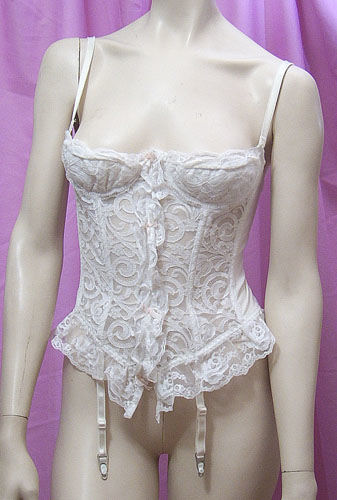
A modern lingerie basque

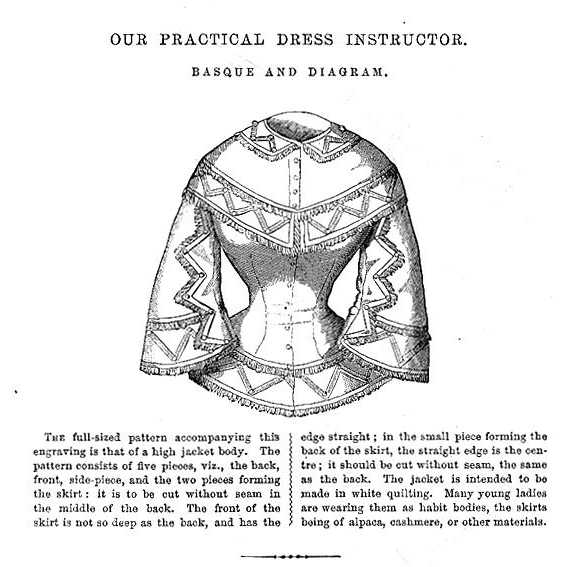
A basque bodice, from Godey's Lady's Book, January 1857

A basque is an item of women's clothing. The term, of French origin, originally referred to types of bodice or jacket with long tails, and in later usage a long corset, characterized by a close, contoured fit and extending past the waistline over the hips. It is so called because the original French fashion for long women's jackets was adopted from Basque traditional dress. In contemporary usage it refers only to a long item of lingerie, in effect a brassiere that continues down, stopping around the waist or the top of the hips. The lower part can either be purely decorative, or it can feature suspenders to be attached to stockings, obviating the need for a garter belt.

In Victorian fashion, basque refers to a closely fitted bodice or jacket extending past the waistline over the hips; depending on era, it may be worn over a hoopskirt (earlier Victorian era) or bustle (later Victorian era). A basque bodice (i.e., when considered as a dress component, to be worn with a specific skirt) could also be referred to as a "corset waist", because of its close fit.

The modern French-language usage is completely different, much closer to the historic original, and usually used in the plural.

== Torsolette ==
In 20th century and contemporary attire, the term is used to refer to certain articles of lingerie, particularly a type of corset known as a torsolette, or alternately a torso-hugging camisole that resembles a corset (typically featuring decorative front or back lace-up detail), but of more delicate construction and offering little or no figure-moulding compression. Instead the modern basque usually emphasizes allure, with details such as frilly lace and cutout, "peekaboo" designs, and sometimes garters (suspenders in British English) to join to stockings.

The undergarment is similar to a Victorian-era corset, but with less compression of the ribs. The modern-day torsolette features lace-up or hook-and-eye fastening, as well as boning or vertical seams for structure and support. It usually, though not always, has brassiere cups and is distinguished from the bustier by its length. In American English, it is sometimes known as a "merry widow" (or "merrywidow").

=== Variations and relatives ===
- A soft torsolette is like an elongated bandeau
- A long torsolette is a corselette
