= Corselet =

Corselet may refer to:

- Corslet, a piece of armor
- Corselette, a female undergarment
- part of a diving suit, see Standard diving dress#Corselet
