= Garter =

Stocking supporter

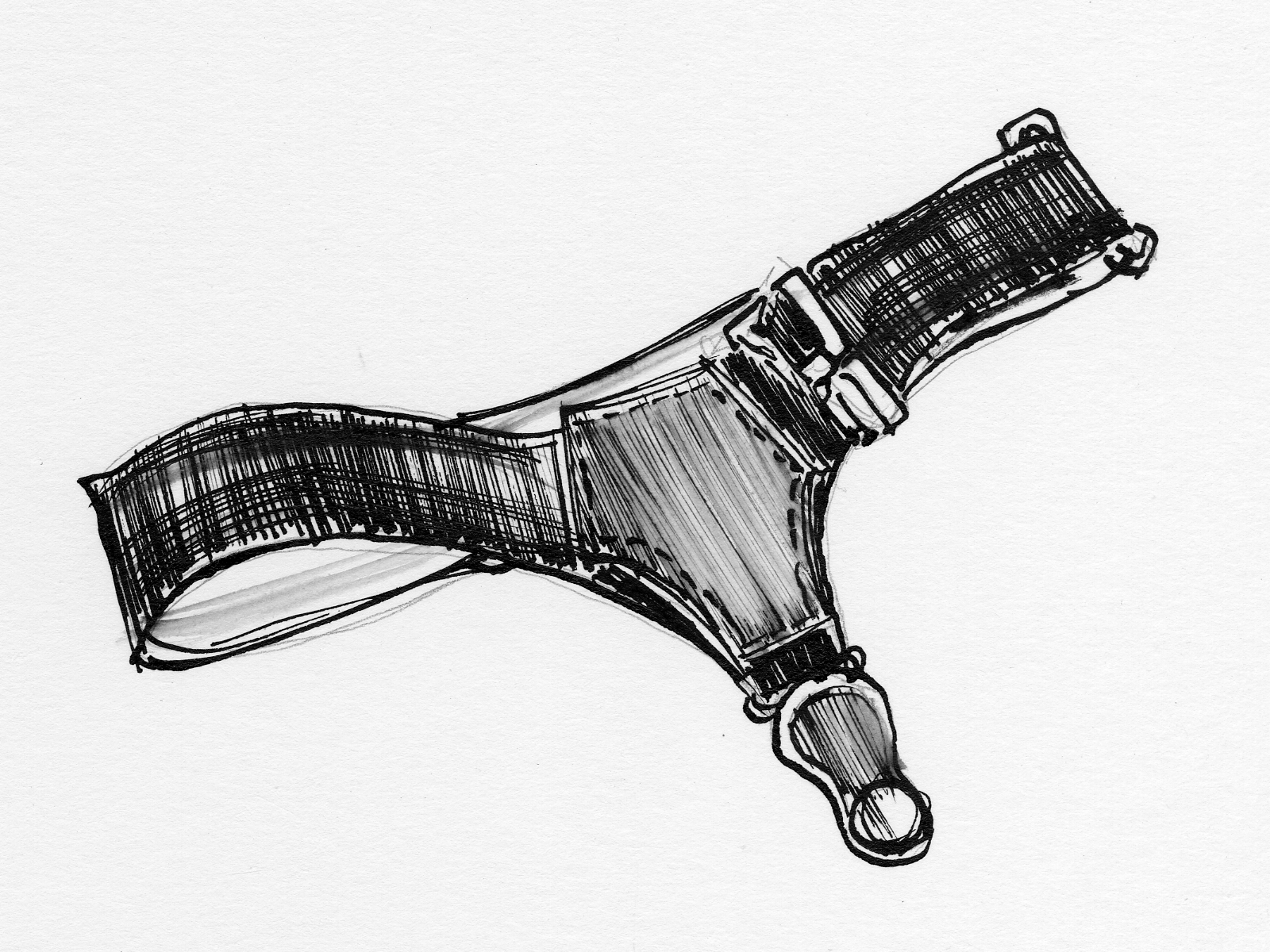
Sketch of a garter. The band goes around the leg, and the hook on the lower side attaches to the top of the stocking.

A garter is an article of clothing comprising a narrow band of fabric fastened about the leg to keep up stockings. In the 18th to 20th centuries, they were tied just below the knee, where the leg is most slender, to keep the stocking from slipping. The advent of elastic has made them less necessary from this functional standpoint, although they are still often worn for fashion. Garters have been widely worn by men and women, depending on fashion trends.

== Garters in fashion ==
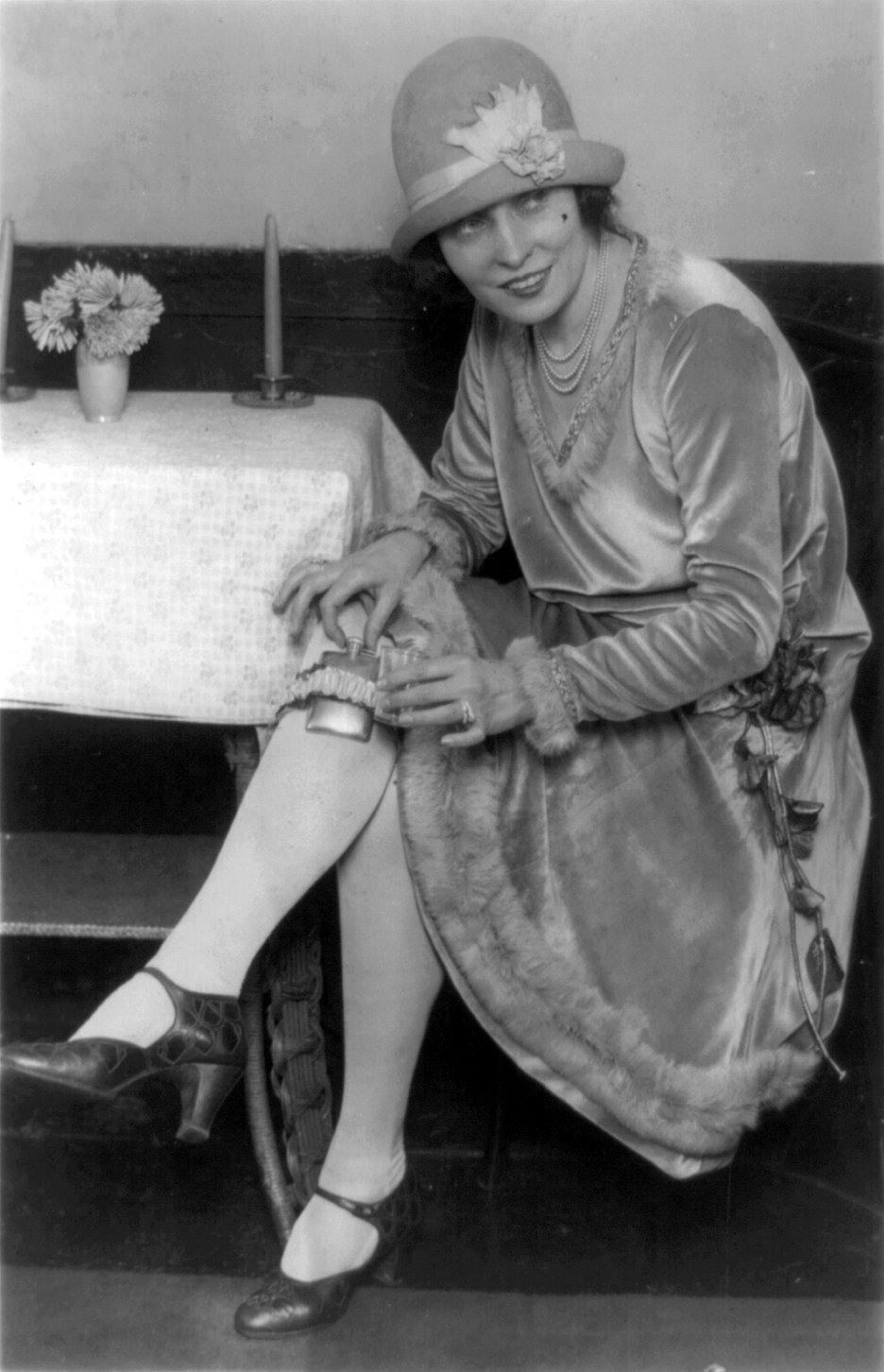
Hip flask tucked into a garter during Prohibition

In Elizabethan era fashions, men wore garters with their hose, and colourful garters were an object of display. In William Shakespeare's Twelfth Night, "cross braced" garters (a long garter tied above and below the knee and crossed between), as worn by the character Malvolio, are an object of some derision. In male fashion for much of the 20th century a type of garter for holding up socks was used as a part of male dress; it is considered somewhat archaic now.

=== Use in wedding traditions ===
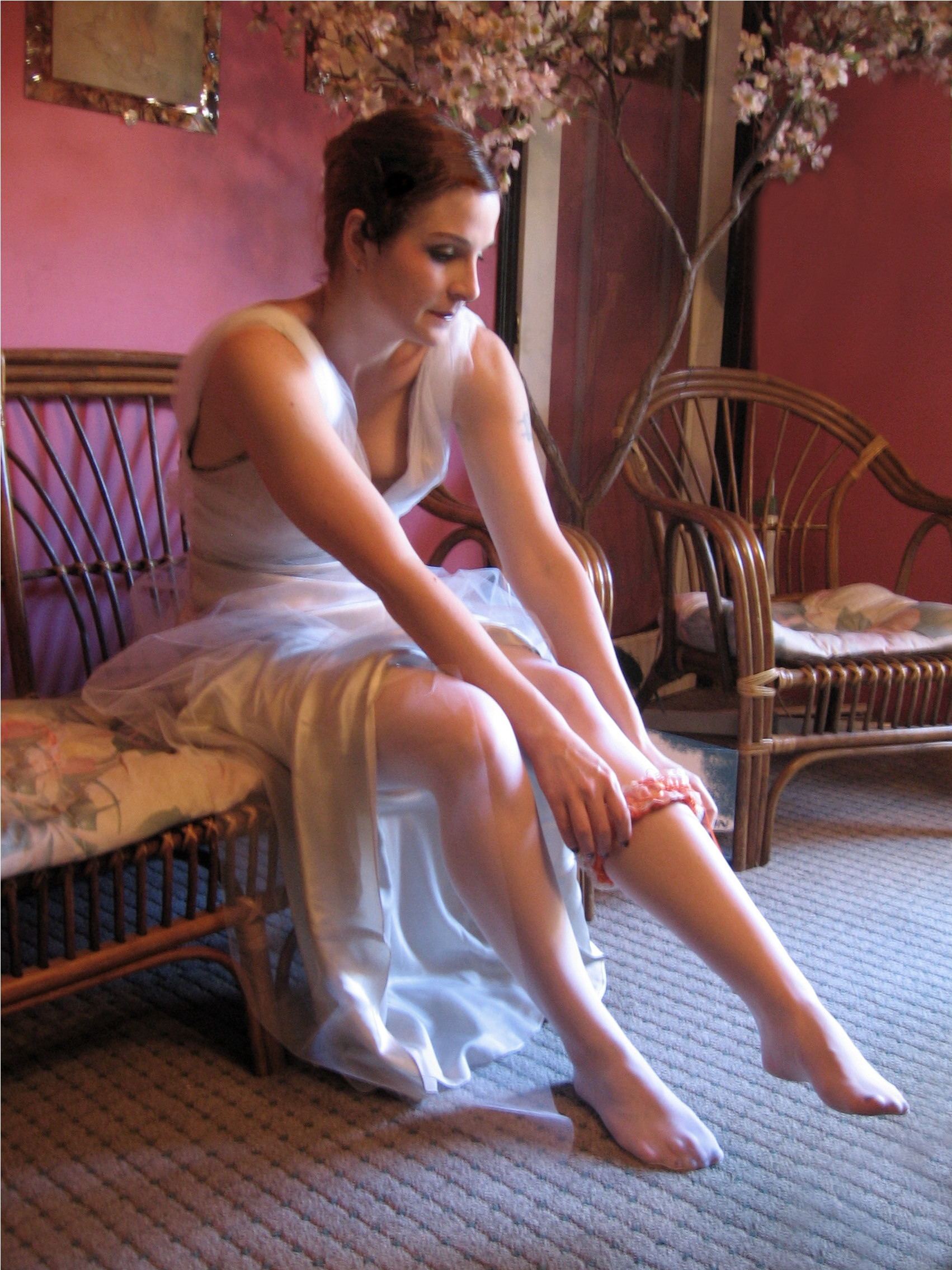
Bride putting on a garter

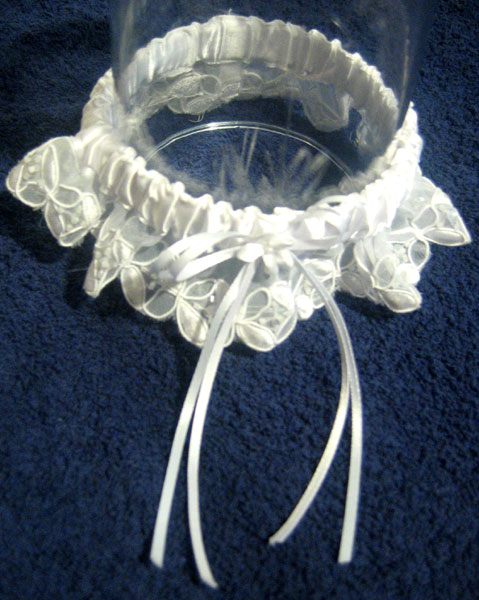
A wedding garter around an upturned wine glass

There is a Western wedding tradition for a bride to wear a garter to the ceremony that the groom later removes in front of the guests at the wedding reception as it draws to a close. This garter is not normally used to support stockings, rather, the practice is often interpreted as symbolic of deflowering, though some sources attribute its origin to a superstition that taking an article of the bride's clothing will bring good luck. In the Middle Ages, the groomsmen would rush at the new bride to take her garters as a prize.

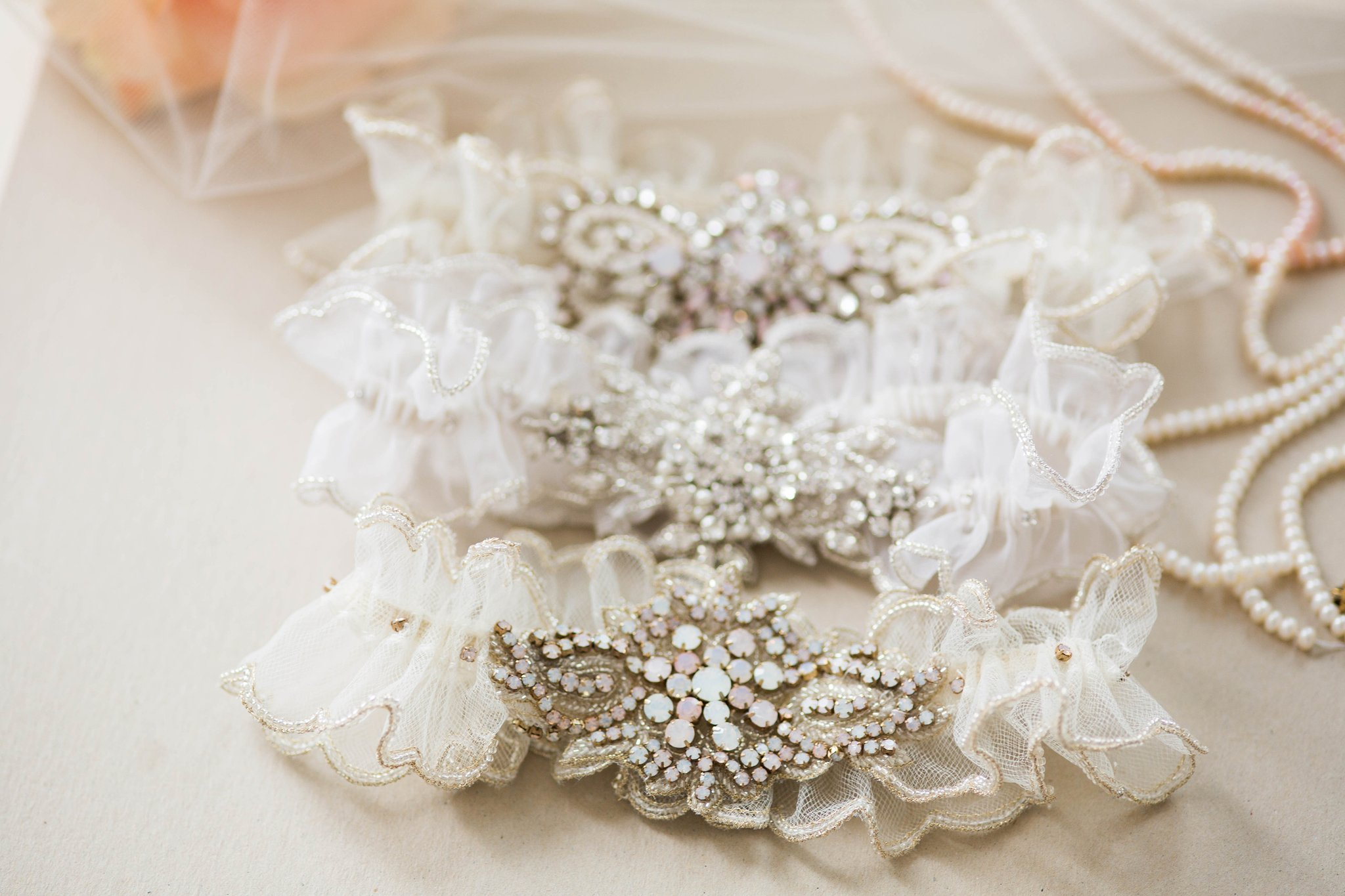
Jewelled wedding garter

Today, the practice of removing the bride's garter is traditionally reserved for the groom, who will then toss the garter to the unmarried male guests. This is performed after the tossing of the bouquet, in which the bride tosses her bouquet over her shoulder to be caught by the unwed female guests. According to superstition, the lady who catches the bouquet and the man who catches the garter will be the next man and woman among those in attendance to be married (though not necessarily to each other).

== Suspenders or garter belts and stockings ==
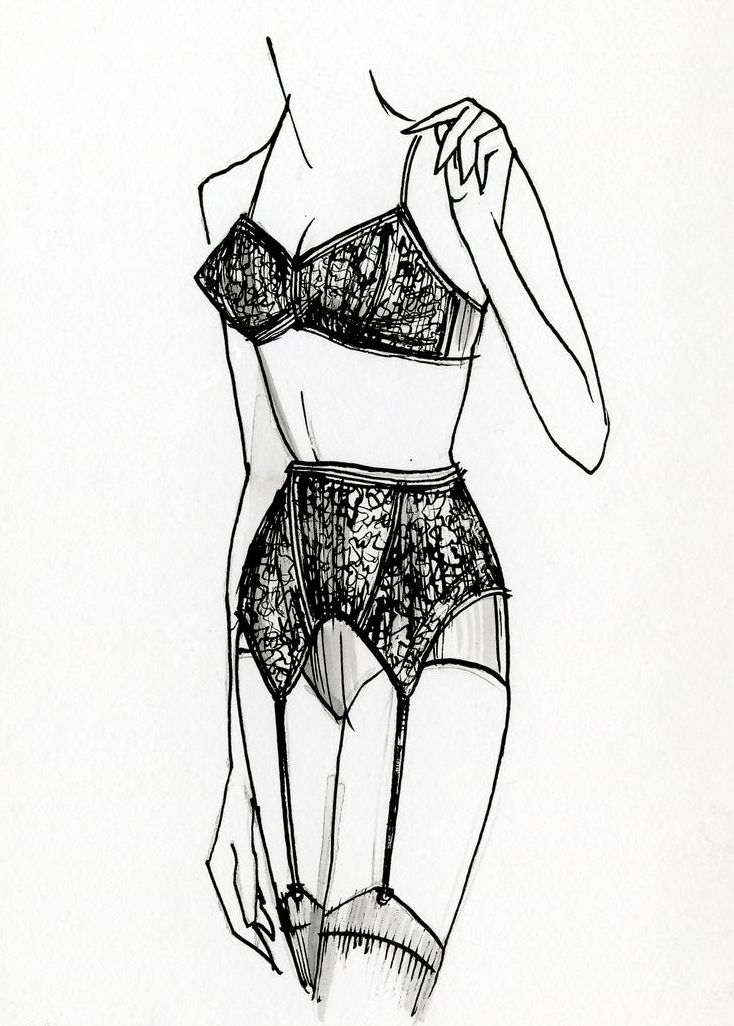
A garter belt attached to stockings

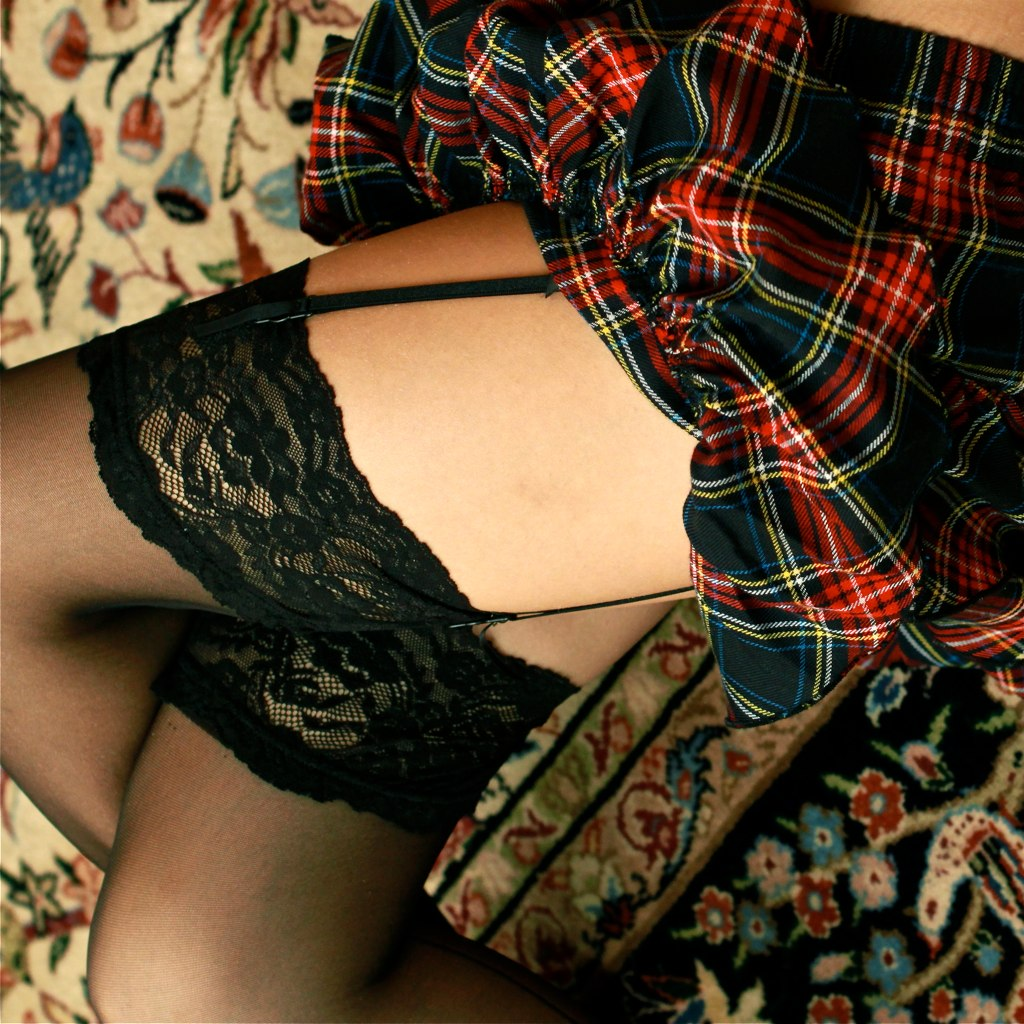
A woman with her suspenders visible

Suspenders or suspender belts, also known as "garter belts" in American English, are underwear consisting of an elasticated material strip usually at least 2 to 3 inches (5.1 to 7.6 cm) in width, though they can be wider. Two or three elastic suspender slings are attached on each side, where the material is shaped to the contours of the body. The suspenders are typically clipped to stockings with metal clips into which a rubber disc is inserted through the stocking material effectively locking the stocking in place. These are normally attached to a length of elastic allowing for adjustment.

Suspender (garter) belts are usually worn at the waist or just slightly below to prevent the belt from sliding down as it is pulled downward by the stockings. Some undergarments such as corselettes or girdles may come with suspender slings attached.

By the late 20th century and into the 21st, pantyhose or tights were more widely worn than stockings. And some stockings, referred to as hold-ups, have a band of silicone rubber molded to the stocking top to keep them up without suspenders. But suspenders continue to be used by people who prefer stockings to tights, and doctors may advise patients with a history of vaginal yeast infections or UTIs to avoid tights.

While most commonly used for regular stockings, suspender belts can also be used for medical support hosiery worn due to varicose veins or poor circulation.

Stockings are often considered to be sensual or erotic, both in person and in photographs, and some people enjoy dressing up for special occasions in attractive suspender belts or basques.

=== In ice hockey ===
Ice hockey players use suspenders for holding up hockey socks. As these socks are essentially woollen tubes, they need to be kept from rolling onto ankles. The socks can be held up by either hockey tape or hockey suspenders, which function like stocking suspenders.

== History ==
=== 18th century ===
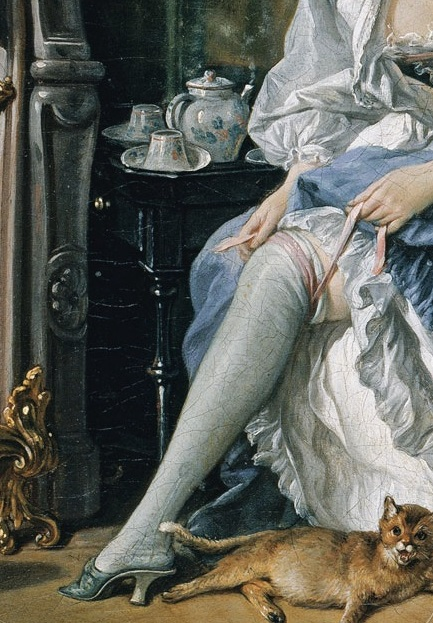
La Toilette, (detail) François Boucher, 1742

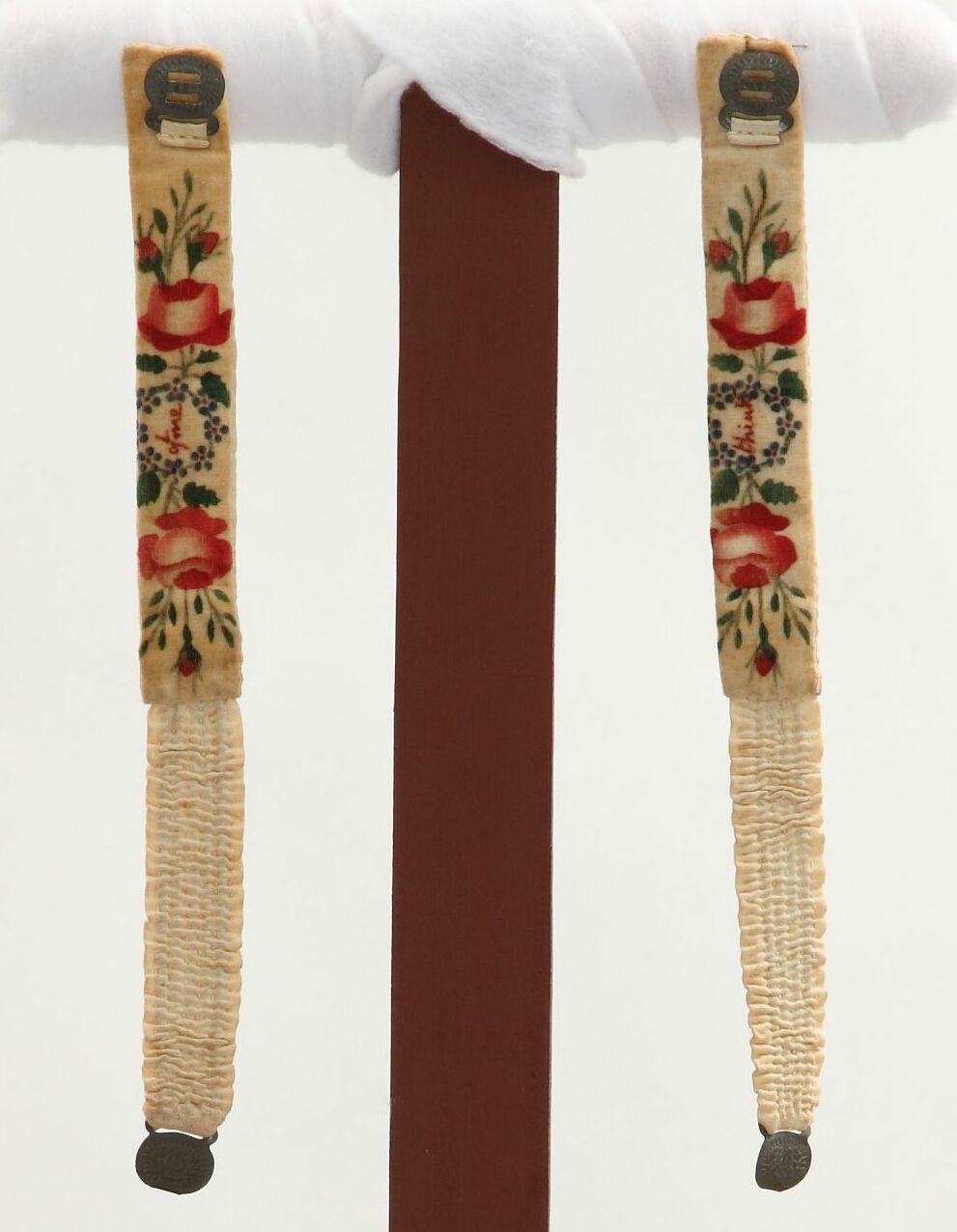
White velvet garters with floral pattern, from the collection of Conner Prairie

Garters in the 18th century could be elaborately decorated and were sometimes embroidered with names, dates, mottoes, or humorous phrases. Prior to the invention of elastic, they were fastened by buckles, or threaded with spiral springs to grip the wearer's leg.

=== 19th century ===
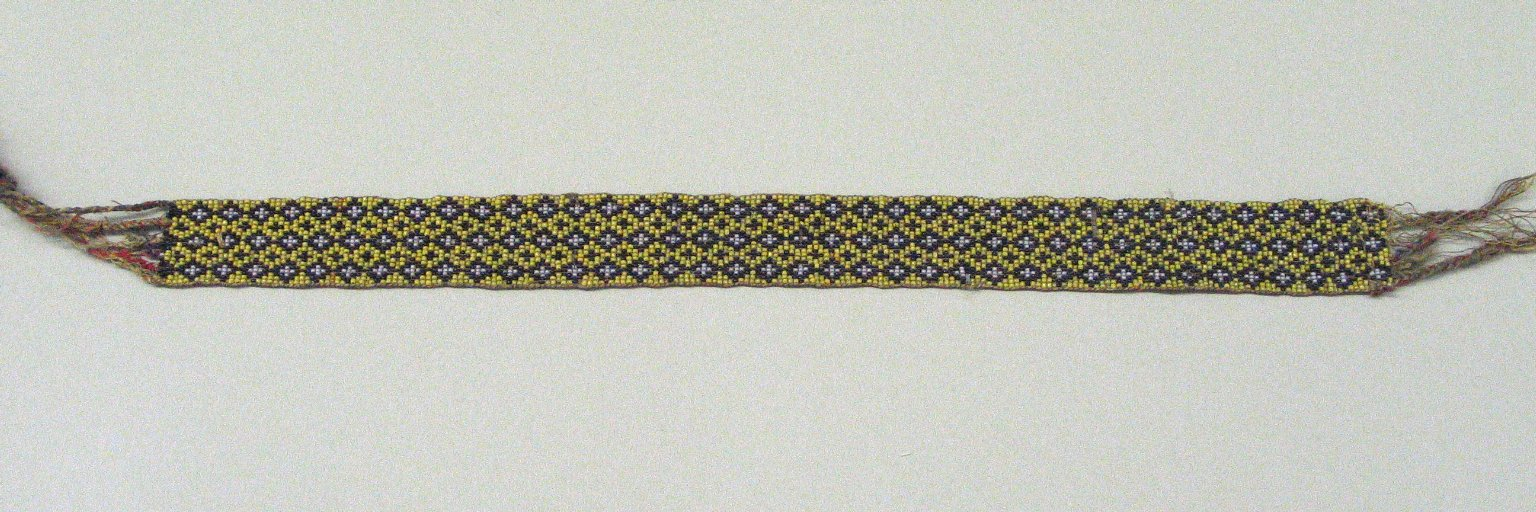
Early 19th century Chippewan garter, Brooklyn Museum

Some women wore stockings with a plain elastic garter or narrow material tied tightly, not suspenders, or by simply rolling the top of the stocking, because it seemed more practical or they could not afford classic corsetry, thus creating a kind of predecessor of the modern hold-ups. This was particularly common among servants and housemaids, particularly until the mid-1920s when the more modern suspender became readily available.

During the world's first long-distance journey by car in 1888, Bertha Benz, the wife of automobile inventor Carl Benz, used a garter to insulate a broken wire of the Benz Patent-Motorwagen Nr. 3. In remembrance of the historic road trip, today's official German scenic byway Bertha Benz Memorial Route follows the tracks of Bertha Benz from Mannheim via Heidelberg to Pforzheim (Black Forest) and back. Stockings have also been used as an emergency replacement for a car's fanbelt.

=== 20th century ===
During World War II, Women's Auxiliary Air Force members were issued inexpensive suspenders.

From the 1940s to the 1960s, suspenders became a common, popular alternative to the girdle, especially among teens and young women. Amid concerns girdles might cause abdominal flabbiness, suspender belts offered a more practical and comfortable choice when used to hold up stockings. Then, by the early 1960s, the introduction of pantyhose offered a new alternative to garter belts and girdles. This change in fashion coincided with the female empowerment movement and the sexual revolution.

Since the mid-20th century, men's adult magazines featuring images of women in underwear reached mass-market popularity. These magazines evolved from pin-up posters and often showcased models in suspenders and stockings, usually with slips, petticoats, corsets, or a bra and knickers or panties. Most images have an erotic element and are sometimes presented as fetish fashion and a form of pornography. Like jewelry, the purpose of garters and other lingerie in adult media is as a statement of excess and to draw attention to certain parts of the wearer's body.

In 1982 the novel Lace by British writer Shirley Conran was released with an extensive promotional scheme, which included giveaways of garters embroidered with the title in gold, along with copies of the bonkbuster itself. After the release of Bull Durham in June 1988, garter belt and stocking sales increased at Victoria's Secret and Frederick's of Hollywood stores. The lingerie retailers attributed the jump in sales to the black lace garter Susan Sarandon wore in the film. Other films that year, like Dangerous Liaisons and Working Girl, also fueled the intimate apparel industry.

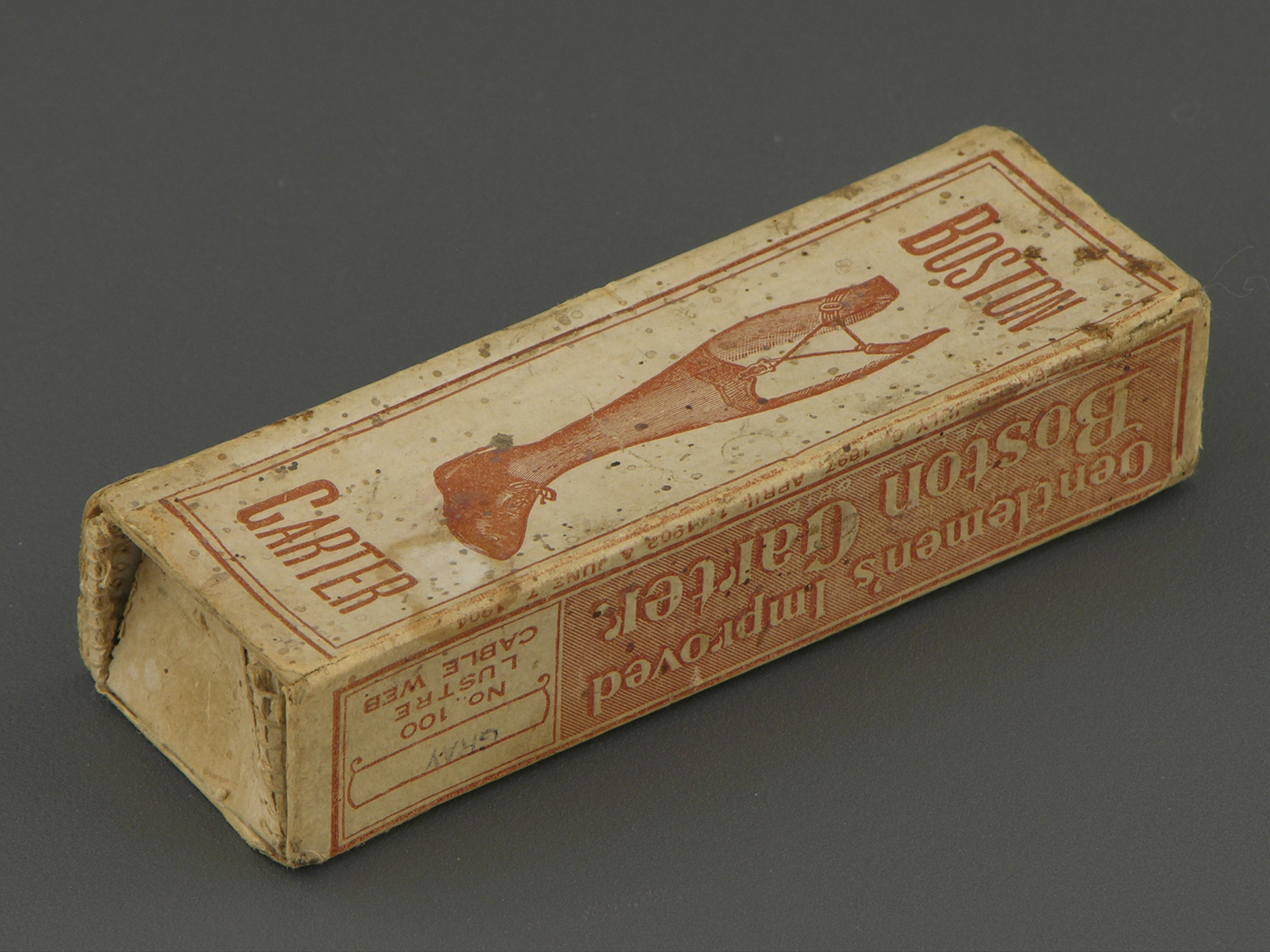
Boston Garter sock garters for men from the beginning of the 20th century from the permanent collection of the Museo del Objeto del Objeto

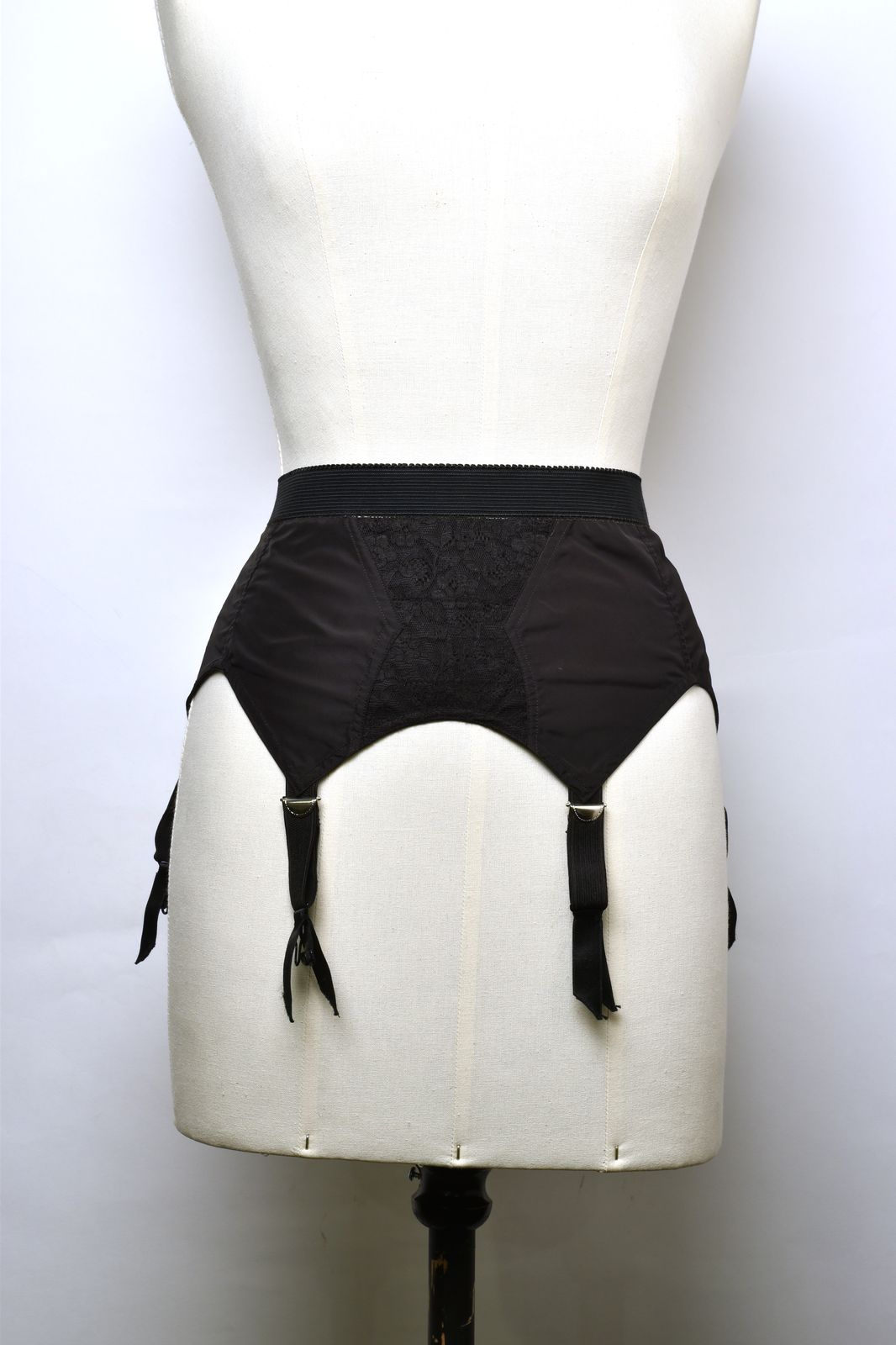
Garter belt, between 1955 and 1965, ModeMuseum Antwerpen

== Order of the Garter ==
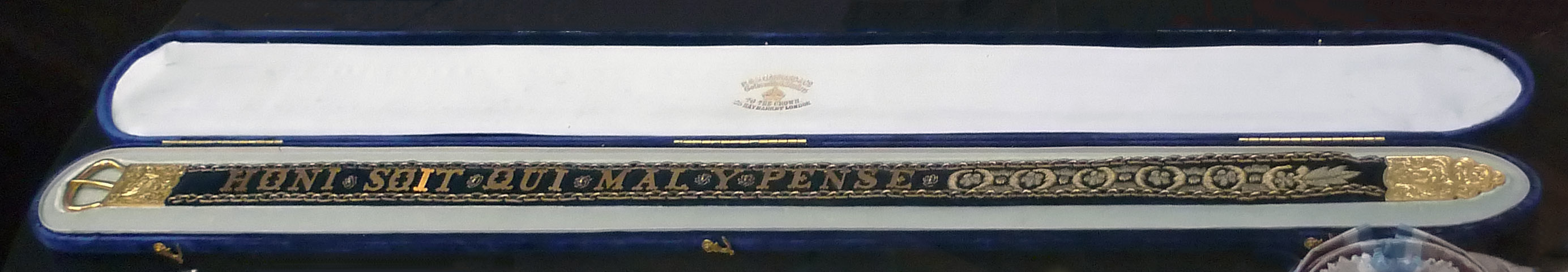
The garter of the Order of the Garter of Austrian Emperor Franz Joseph I

The Order of the Garter, which is the oldest and highest British order of chivalry, was founded in 1348 by Edward III. The Order consists of the reigning monarch, who is Sovereign of the Order, the Prince of Wales, and up to 24 Knights Companion, plus any honorary members from the British royal family or foreign monarchies.

The origin of the symbol of the Most Noble Order of the Garter, a blue 'garter' with the motto Honi Soit Qui Mal Y Pense, is not known, as the earliest records of the order were destroyed by fire; however, the story is that at a ball possibly held at Calais, Joan, Countess of Salisbury dropped her garter and King Edward, seeing her embarrassment, picked it up and bound it about his own leg saying in French, "Evil [or shamed] be he that thinks evil of it." This story is almost certainly a later fiction. This fable appears to have originated in France and may have been invented to discredit the Order.

It is thought more likely that as the garter was a small strap used as a device to attach pieces of armour, it was appropriate to use the garter as a symbol of binding together in common brotherhood, whilst the motto probably refers to the leading political topic of the 1340s, Edward's claim to the throne of France.

The patron saint of the Order is Saint George, the patron saint of soldiers and also of England, and the chapel of the order is St George's Chapel, Windsor Castle.

== See also ==
- Sleeve garter
- Suspenders
