= Spoon busk =

Specialised corset fastener

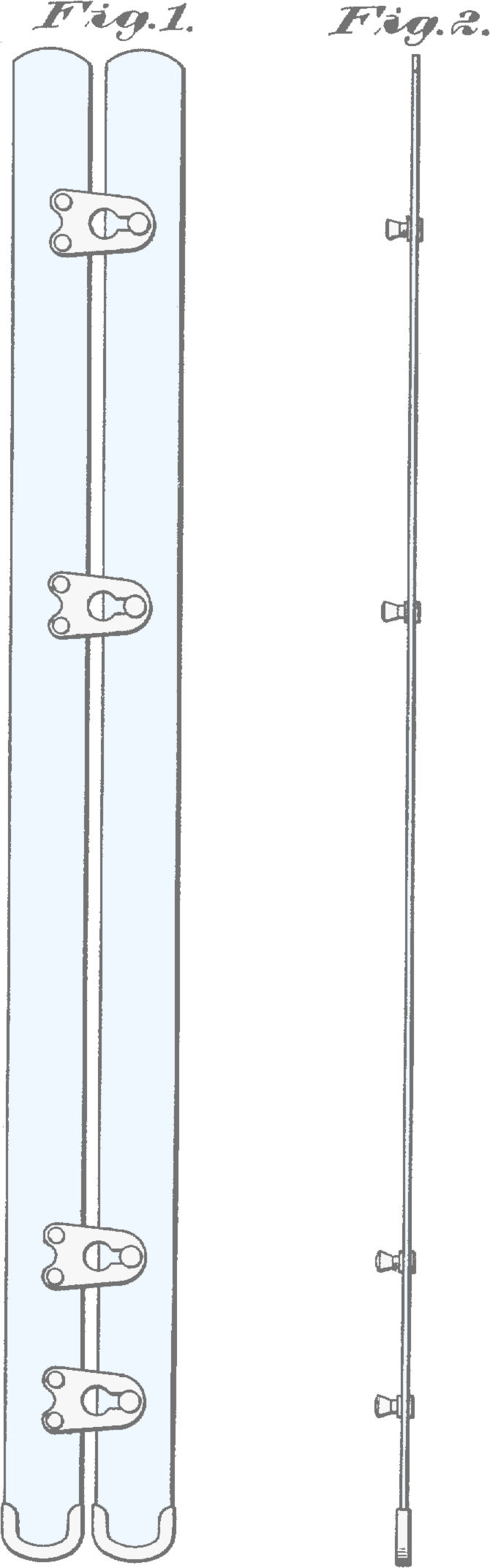
a modern busk from 1919, to compare

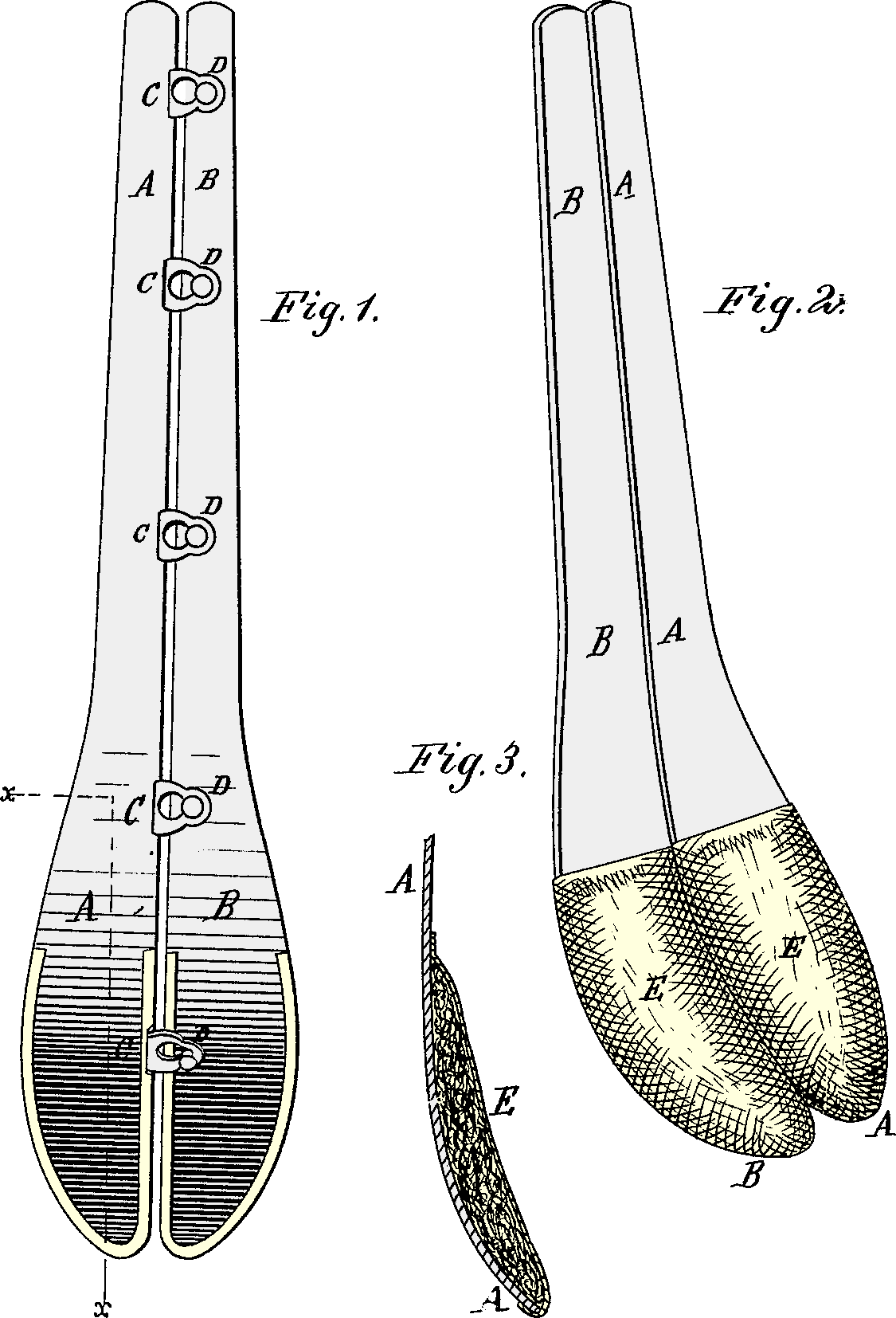
The pads E will prevent the lower ends of the steels A B from hurting the wearer when she sits down; from 1879.

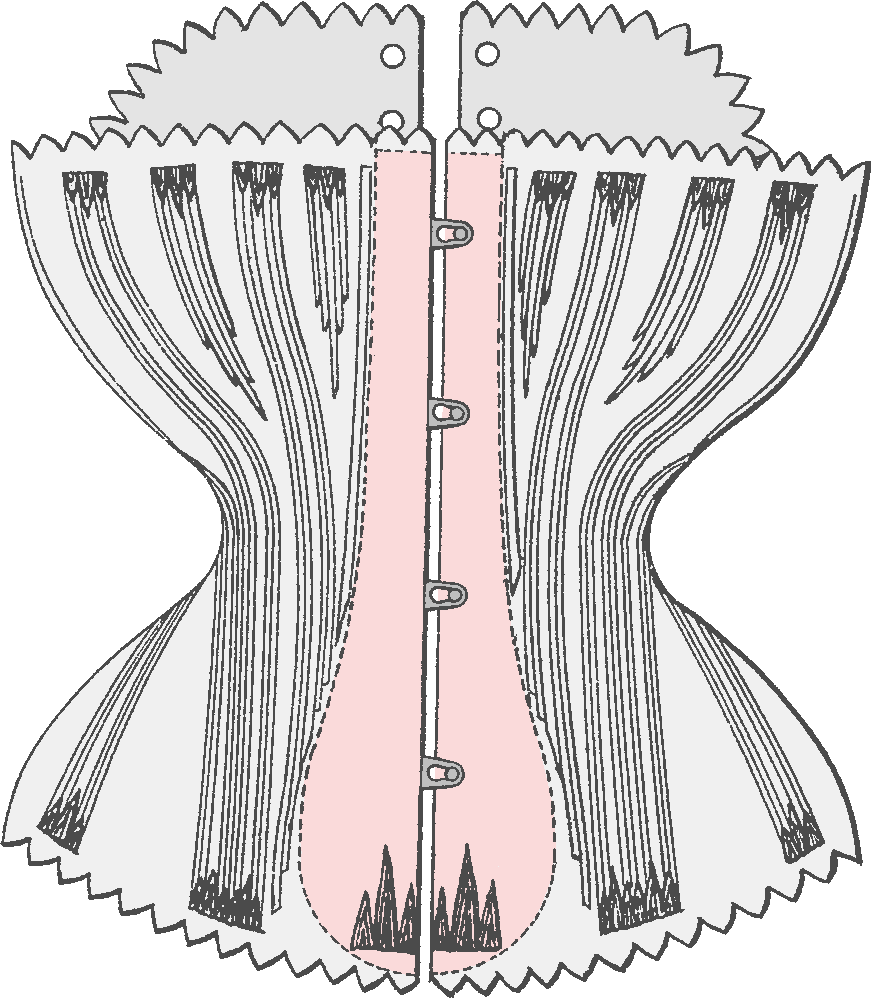
Corset from 1873. The spoon busk is covered in fabric but shown shaded pink, for clarity.

The spoon busk was a specialised kind of busk—the rigid element of a corset placed at the centre front. As its name implies, it was shaped like a spoon, with the bottom part of the busk widening and taking a dished form. It was invented in 1879 by Joseph Beckel of New York City.

The spoon busk allowed a greater reduction in waist size without producing a bulge of flesh at the bottom edge of the corset. This was a problem experienced when corsets with straight busks of even width were tightly laced: as the flesh of the abdomen was, essentially, squeezed out of place and appeared where there was no pressure. The wide, dished part of a spoon busk accommodated the abdomen, and at the same time compressed and controlled it. Corsets with spoon busks usually descended to a point lower than the level of the hips at the front.

Despite the extra control given by spoon busks, they are not favoured by modern tightlacers as the bottom point of a spoon busk will dig in when a corset is very tight. If a spoon busk is used, it is in a modified version with no dished shape.

== Steel spoon busks ==
Galvanized steel spoon busks are not suited for tight lacing because the steel becomes brittle during the manufacturing process. Stainless steel spoon busks, on the other hand, are suitable if reinforced with a layer of flat steel behind the busk. Wissner, a busk and boning manufacturer in Germany makes stainless steel busks. They stopped making galvanized spoon busks because they were breaking under the pressure of tight lacing. If a person buys a spoon busk, they should make sure it is stainless steel and reinforce it with flat boning behind the busk.

There is still no guarantee that the spoon busk will stand up to tight lacing.
