= Busk (corsetry) =

Rigid element of a corset

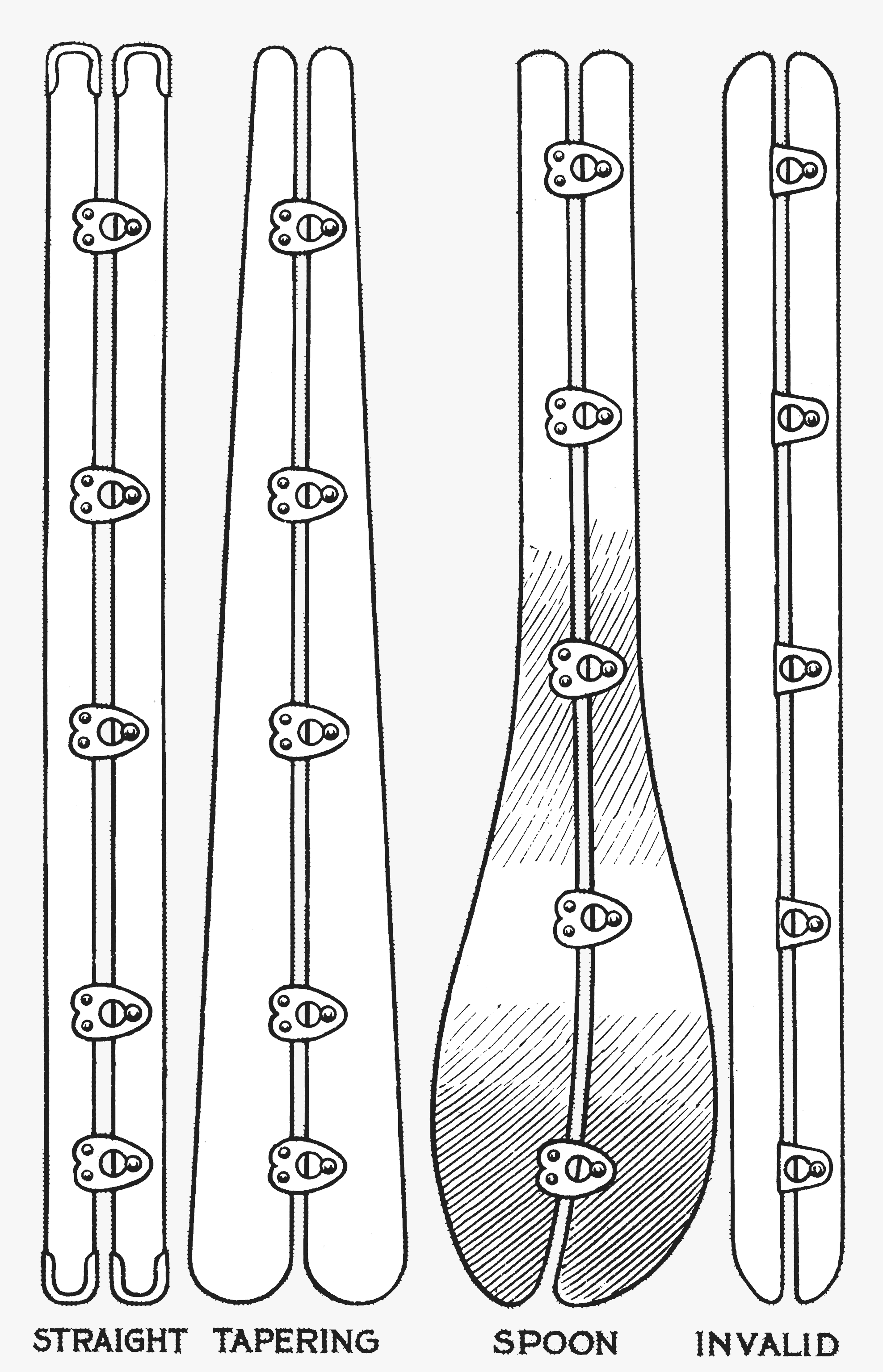
Front Claps for corsets

A busk (also spelled busque) is a rigid element of a corset at the centre front of the garment. Two types exist, one- and two-part busks.

Single-piece busks were used in "stays" and bodices from the sixteenth to early nineteenth centuries and were intended to keep the front of the corset or bodice straight and upright. They were typically made of wood, ivory, or bone slipped into a pocket and tied in place with a lace called the busk point. These busks were often carved and decorated, or inscribed with messages, and were popular gifts from men to women during courtship.

Busks made from whale baleen first appear in the wardrobe accounts of Elizabeth I in the 1580s.

In the middle of the nineteenth century, a new form of busk appeared. It was made of two long pieces of steel, one with loops and the other with posts, that functioned in the same way as hook and eye fastenings or buttons on a garment. This made corsets considerably easier to put on and take off, as the laces did not have to be loosened as much as when the corset had to go over the wearer's head and shoulders. The second half of the nineteenth century also saw the invention of the spoon busk.
