= Bustier =

Form-fitting strapless undergarment

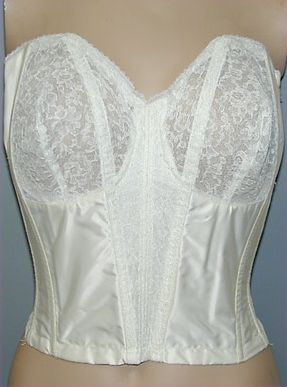
- Type: form-fitting garment

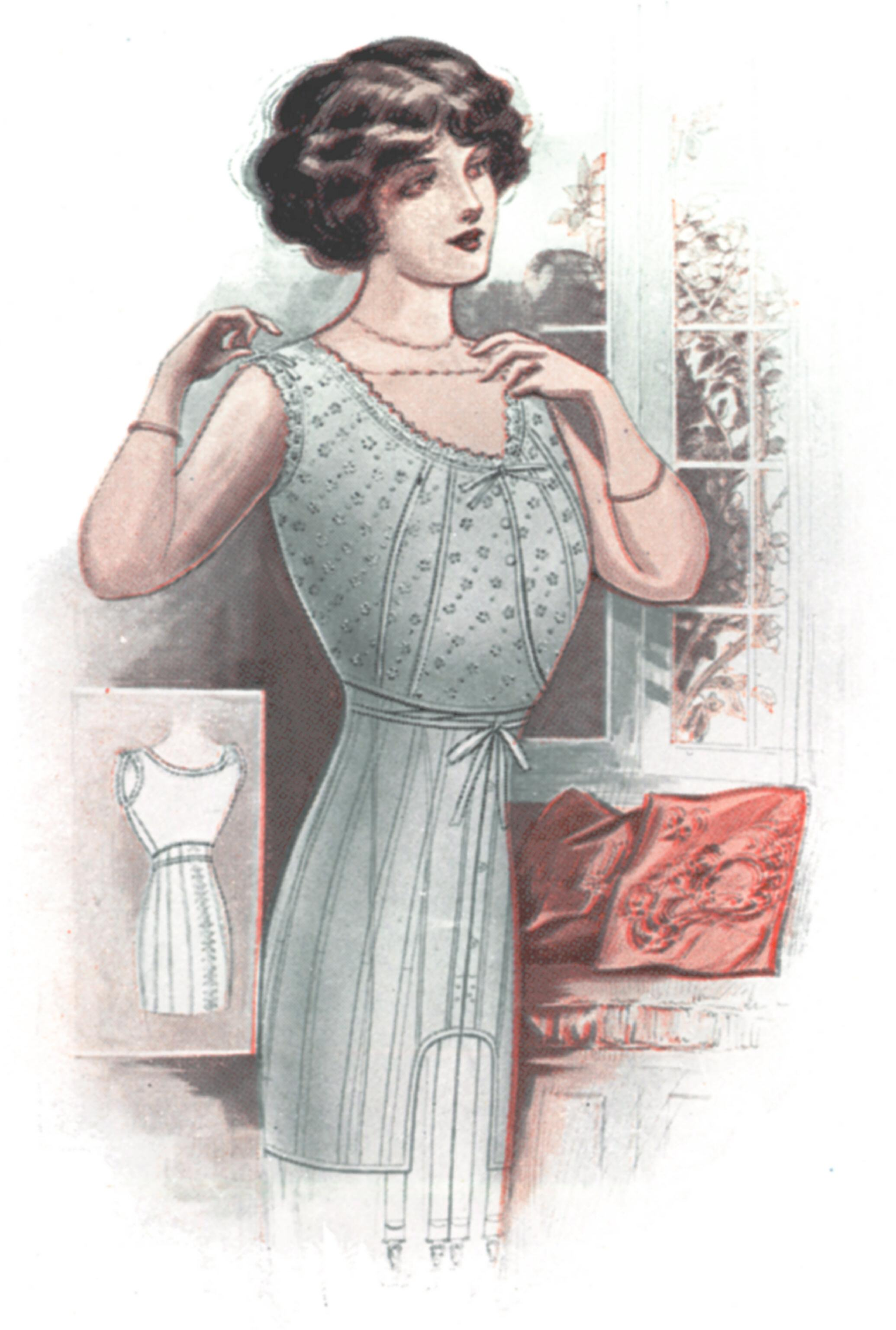
Classic corset from 1913

A bustier (UK: /ˈbuːstieɪ, ˈbʌst-/ BOO-stee-ay, BUST-ee-ay, US: /buːˈstjeɪ, ˌbuːstiˈeɪ, ˌbʌst-/ boo-STYAY, BOO-stee-AY, BUST-ee-AY) or bustiere is a form-fitting garment typically worn by women traditionally worn as lingerie. Its primary purpose is to push up the bust by tightening against the upper midriff and forcing the breasts up while gently shaping the waist. Nowadays, it might also be worn as a push-up bra under a low-backed dress or as a camisole for outerwear. The bustier can also be worn as a half-slip under sheer upper garments if a bold display of the midriff is not desired.

== Resemblance to the basque ==
A bustier resembles a basque, but it is shorter. It reaches down only to the ribs or waist.

== Material ==
Modern bustiers are often made with mesh panels rather than the traditional boning.

== See also ==
- Bodystocking
- Bra
- Bralette
- Corset
