= Ring, slide and hook =

Lingerie accessories

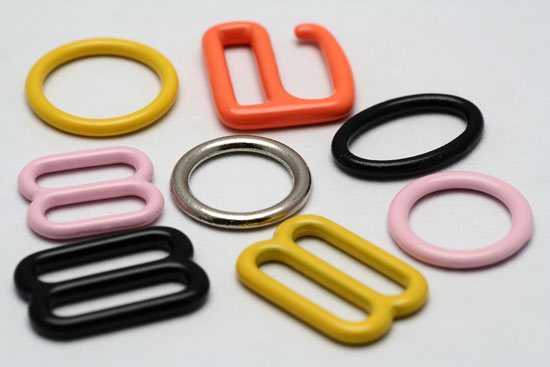
An assortment of rings, slides and hooks

Rings, slides and hooks are the accessories used in intimate apparel/lingerie used for adjustment and decorative functions. Rings, slides and hooks are commonly made of plastic and nylon coated metal and stainless steel.

Rings are used for joining straps to allow length adjustment and vary strap angle to bra cup. A ring can be in any shape, for example circular, rectangular, triangular or even heart and flower shaped.

A slide has its crossbar recessed below the planes of edges of the longitudinal limits, which limits sliding of the frame on a strap. The slide has its thickest portions at the centers of transverse bars at which the central bar merges with the remainder of the slide. The strap passes around the central bar or directly through one of the slots to a ring and returns through that slot across the central bar and through the other slot in the slide to the shoulder of the wearer.

A hook has a rectangular shape, similar to the slides but with an opening at its one end which used to hang detachable or multi-way straps to a bra. It is hooking bra shoulder straps to a strapless bra, re-positioning the straps to achieve the various looks, such as halter-neck and crossed-back.

== History ==
Rings and slides have been used on apparel products since the 1800s. Found from the US patent document number 174,459 in year 1876, Alexander Adamson applied on suspenders – rings for providing varying strap angle and slide for positioning the back straps.

From the US patent document number 863,159 in year 1907, Ellen M. Degenhart invented slides in a garment supporter, which is for strap length adjustment.

Brassieres date from the early 1900s. At the initial stage, they are with the very simple design, made from two handkerchiefs and narrow strap, with no ring or slide for adjusting strap length. Later, slide was introduced to the brassiere for increasing or reducing the strap length. Found from the US patent document number 1,590,693 in year 1926, Elvira Campa McKeefrey put slides on straps. It is said the first bra with adjustable straps.

However, rings launched on brassieres were much later about 1940s. Sam Samuels patented the invention in US, document number 2,246,638 in year 1941.

The predecessor of hooks on brassieres was the buttons and buttonholes. The introduction of hooks was documented in US patent number 2,140,164 by William H. Moffatt in year 1938.

== Types ==
Ring, slide and hook have similar product form. They are designed with wide varieties in term of shape, size and material.

=== Material ===
Ring, slide and hook can be made with metal, metal with nylon coated, electro-plated metal and plastics. Metal gives the strongest strength among the four materials. Metal with nylon coated and electro-plated prevent oxidation and rusting. Metal with nylon coated and plastic provide wide range of colours for matching with the garment. The electro-plated only available in gold and silver colour, ultimate thin and modern appearance.

=== Shape ===
Shape of ring, slide and hook has huge variety, depend on the shape of mould from different manufacturers. The most common shape for ring is circle which looks like an "O". Triangle, rectangle, square, heart, star shape, rectangle with saw tooth shape or even flower shape can be found for the different purposes on intimate garment.

Most commonly seen slide and hook are in rectangular shapes which look like "8" and "9" respectively. The shape of slide usually varies in the size of two holes, which allows different sliding way. Different opening combinations are found for hook, e.g. "S" shape which has hook on each side, narrower hole and wide hook, double-crossbar for the hole and hook.

=== Size ===
Common size range for rings, slides and hooks is from 6 mm (0.24 in) to 30 mm (1.2 in). The range may vary, depending on different manufacturer's collection. For full-figured women bras, wider straps and elastics in used for good support of breast weight. The bigger rings and slides required (12 mm (0.47 in) or 15 mm (0.59 in)). On the other hand, smaller rings, slides and hooks (8 mm (0.31 in) or 10 mm (0.39 in)) are found on normal bras sizes (A cup and B cup). The most common size of ring, slide and hook are 10 mm (0.39 in), 12 mm (0.47 in) and 15 mm (0.59 in).There are extremely large rings and hooks can be found on the swimwear items work as the underband fastener and decoration.

== Uses ==
=== Rings ===
Rings are usually found on the shoulder straps, where they function as a joint. For intimate apparel, the requirement of front strap can be different from back strap. The front strap is more decorative and stretchability is less of a concern while the back strap is required to have better stability when stretched. Therefore, the two different straps (front and back) and the ring found on intimate apparel are important to join the functions of the bra strap together.

Circular rings allow straps to be worn at different angles, and they are the most commonly used ring shape now.

Ring develops in more shapes nowadays like Rectangular, Triangular, Heart and even flower shape. 90° angles on Rectangular ring limited the angle of strap line on the shoulder. Strap won't be able to move outer or inner the shoulder.

Triangular shape on Ring can be found on the petite size intimate garment while the wearer has narrow shoulder. The straps can line inner the shoulders and avoid the straps slide off from shoulder. More application on the Triangular Ring is on the Racer Back Bras for joining the straps to underband.

Heart shape is performing similar function in different appearance.

Ring developed with Jaggy inner avoid the easy sliding by increase the friction between the Ring and straps.

=== Slides ===
Slide gives an adjustable function to the shoulder strap, or suspender belt on the most left hand side and the middle one.

Since women have different body shape, shoulder to breast measurement, length adjustment is an important function. Straps with slides allow wearers to adjust desired length on intimate garment. Slide has its crossbar recessed below the planes of edges of the longitudinal limits, which limits sliding of the frame on a strap. The slide has its thickest portions at the centers of transverse bars at which the central bar merges with the remainder of the slide. The strap passes around the central bar or directly through one of the slots to a ring and returns through that slot across the central bar and through the other slot in the slide to the shoulder of the wearer.

The slide shapes usually develop according to the Ring shape in order to match and function together. The inner shape of the slide is designing to suit the straps thickness and shapes.

Circular inner shape always using for spaghetti strap while rectangular inner shape is for wider flat strap. The height of inner is referring to the thickness of the straps.

Jaggy inner slide has the same function as jaggy inner ring, to reduce the ease of sliding the straps. Difference shapes developed for slide nowadays are for decorative function. Swimwear and Triangle bra found a big slide on the centre gore, on the most right hand side, these can be special shapes like Heart, Star and Flower shapes.

=== Hooks ===
Hook function as fastener on detachable shoulder strap or suspender belt, it is also function as a fastener on swimwear back closure and front-closure bra. A Multiway-Bra is playing the different straps positions on the Bra.

The most common type of hook is like a "9" shape, the circular part is used to hold the shoulder strap whereas the hook part is the fastening and joining shoulder strap on or off the bra.

"S" shape hook provide straps changing function. The one with narrow hole and wide hook is designed for special straps. More shapes provide for different using and security purpose.

== Manufacturing process ==
Rings, slides and hooks are made with the similar materials, sizes and shapes.

There are various methods to produce them depending on the different raw materials and end used. The production will be with four main sections as follows.

1. Preparation of raw materials
2. Molding or stamping
3. Colour finishing
4. Inspection, packing and recycling

=== Preparation ===
There are three main types of raw material used in the industry. They are plastic, metal and alloy.

==== Plastic ====
Plastic items are produced by injection molding. The plastics usually are acrylonitrile butadiene styrene (ABS), polyoxymethylene(POM), which is the most popular, and polycarbonate (PC), which is used for transparent colors. Plastic items can be produced in a wide range of colours. They don't have corrosion issues, but have less strength and luster than metal and alloy pieces.

1. Preparing raw materials
  - Calculate lab-dip formula to meet colour specification
  - Mix polymers and colourants according to approved lab-dip
  - Dehydrate the mixtures for 12 hours
2. Making mold
  - Design mold according to requirement – shape and size specification and they can be made of steel, aluminum, or metal alloy depending on the production volume
  - Make multi-cavity mold to have several copies of the same part to speed up the production time
  - The above steps can be skipped if the existing mold can be re-used

==== Metal ====
Metal items are produced with a stamping press. They are mainly with a simple design (e.g. 2D pattern). Metal pieces are stronger than plastics ones, but less so than alloy ones.

1. Preparing raw materials
  - Select the corrected thickness and width of metal coiled strip to meet the design requirement
2. Making stamping die
  - Design top and bottom dies, according to the requirement – shape and size specification, which can be steel, aluminum depending on the production volume

==== Alloy ====
Alloy pieces, much like plastic ones, are produced by injection molding. They can be designed with detailed lines/wordings. They are also the strongest of the three main types.

1. Preparing raw materials
  - Dehydrate the granules of metal alloy
2. Making mold
  - Design mold according to the requirement – shape and size specification and they can be made of steel, aluminum, or metal alloy depending on the production volume
  - Make multi-cavity mold to have several copies of the same part to speed up the production time
  - The above steps can be skipped if the existing mold can be re-used

=== Molding or stamping ===
==== Plastic ====
- Adjust the optimum machine setting of the injection molding machine, e.g. heater temperature, holding pressure, mold open/close time, injection time, cooling time and ejection time
- Pour dehydrated polymer mixtures into injection molding machine
- Collect molded products
- Wash molded pieces to remove any oils, stains, etc.
- Blow dry pieces by drying tool
- Separate molded multiple pieces into individual pieces

==== Metal ====
- Place dies to the stamping machine
- Set the optimum machine setting, e.g. loading pressure, loading time, feeding speed, etc.
- Collect finished pieces
- Re-roll the processed metal scrap

==== Alloy ====
- Adjust the optimum machine setting of the injection molding machine, e.g. heater temperature, holding pressure, mold open/close time, injection time, cooling time and ejection time
- Pour dehydrated metal alloy granules into the machine
- Collect molded products
- Separate molded multiple pieces into individual ones
- Filter out defective products, e.g. burn marks, short shot, etc.

=== Colour finishing ===
The colour finishing process is only for metal and alloy items. For the plastic items, the colouring is done in the preparation phase.

After the preparation process, both of them will be sent to undergo the colouring treatment. There are two common methods used on rings, slides and hooks. One is done by nylon coating and another by electroplating. The thickness of the items depends on that of metal coiled strip / molded alloy pieces; and of nylon coating / electroplating layer. The process enhances the abrasion / wear resistance, corrosion protection and aesthetic qualities e.g. luster and colour. Nylon coating can provide a lot of colour selections on the finished items while electroplating is mainly in gold or silver.

==== Nylon coating ====
- Pre-heat the metal pieces
- Dip the heated pieces into powder-filled container; usually with 2 colours of nylon powders: white for the finished pieces in all colours except black while black for black finished pieces; white and black nylon coatings done in separate rooms to minimize their contaminating each other
- Re-heat powder-covered pieces to melt the powders and then cool down the pieces to complete the encapsulation process
- Calculate lab-dip formula to meet customer's colour specification
- Dye the white nylon powder coated pieces according to customer's approved lab-dip
- Skip the above 2 steps if the finished colour is in white or black

==== Electroplating ====
- Put the metal pieces into the solution connected with electric current
- Coat a conductive thin layer e.g. metal in gold or silver
- Cleaning the pieces

=== Inspection, packing and recycling ===
1. Inspection
  - Filter out defective products, e.g. burn marks, colour streaks, struck pieces, uneven coating, etc.
2. Packing
  - Count and weigh the certain pieces e.g. 500 or 1000 and put them into poly bag
  - Put multi-poly bags into carton box and be ready for delivery
3. Recycling
  - Collect defective products, scrap from molded pieces and processed coiled strips
  - Send them to the recycling companies
