= Corselette =

Woman's foundation garment combining bra and girdle

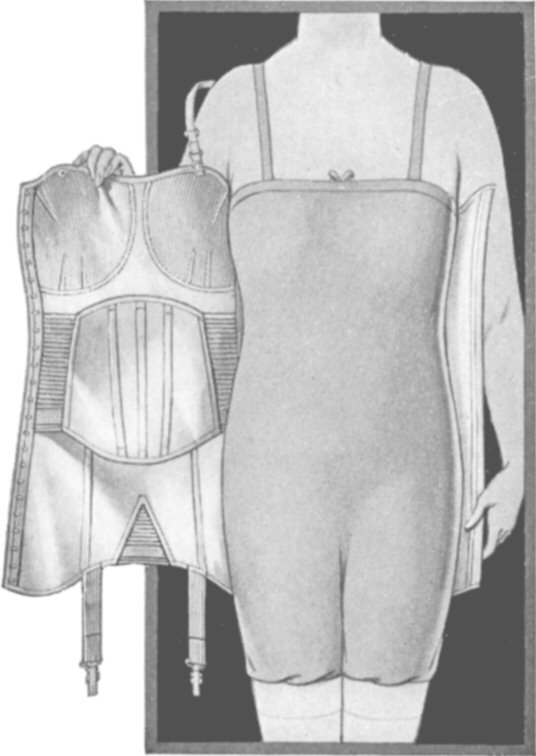
The inside of a corselette

In women's clothing, a corselet or corselette is a type of foundation garment, sharing elements of both bras and girdles. It extends from straps over the shoulders down the torso, and stops around the top of the legs. It may incorporate lace in front or in back. As an undergarment, a corselet can be open-style (with suspenders attached) or panty-style.

Historically, the term corselet referred to a piece of plate armour covering the torso; see corslet.

== History ==
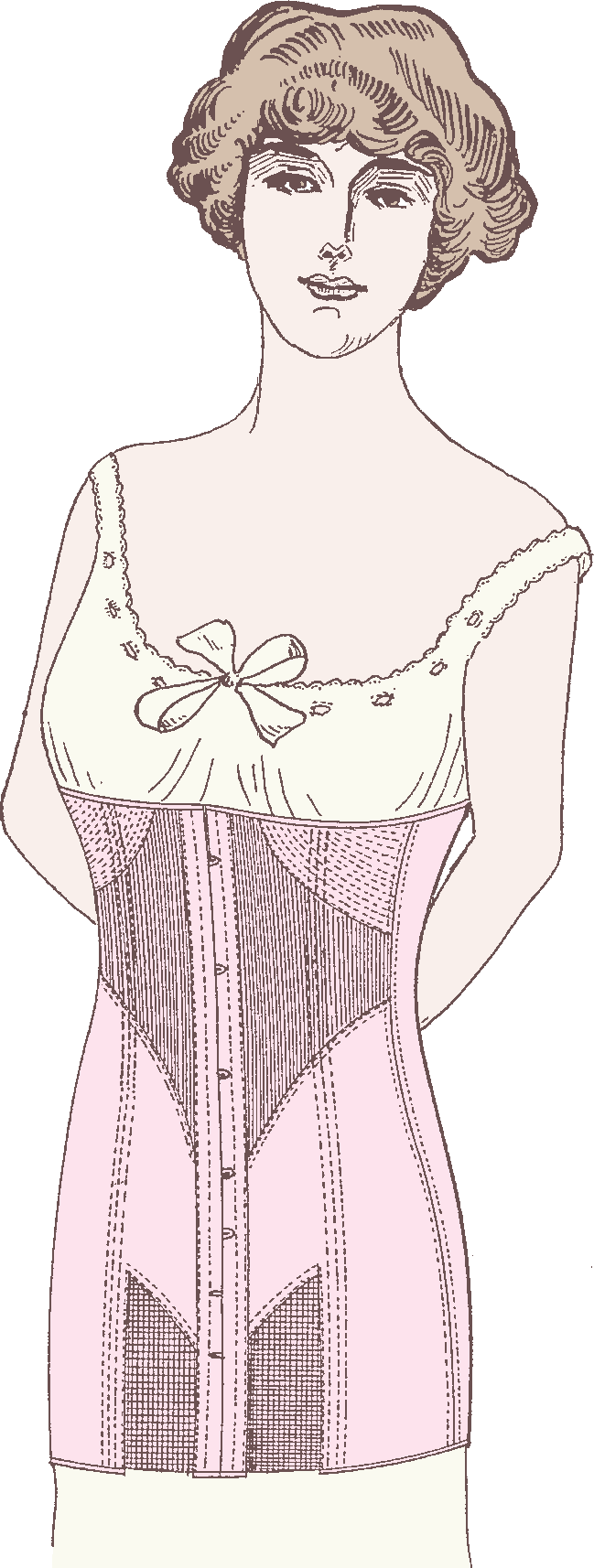
The missing link between corset and corselette, from 1914

The English word for the piece of armor comes from cors, an Old French word meaning "bodice". The modern term probably originated by the addition of the diminutive suffix "-ette" to the word corset, itself of similar origin to "corselet".

The corselet as an item of women's clothing began to gain popularity in 1914, as a substitute for wearing two separate pieces (a bra with either a girdle or a corset). The bust uplift cups were first introduced in 1933, but did not become common until 1943.

=== Merry widow ===
A corselet was released by Warner's in 1952, named after The Merry Widow, a 1905 operetta which has been adapted several times into feature-length films. "Merry widow" remains a common generic term for a corsetry-type garment in the United States, or a "basque" in the UK. It is usually strapless, and stopping on the hips, rather than extending below the hip line, like the typical corselet. A merry widow type garment is normally fastened by hooks and eyes at the rear, and because it is strapless, it needs to be well boned to prevent it from rolling over, the boning helping to support the demi-cup section. A merry widow/basque would also incorporate suspenders/garters for attaching to stockings. This type of lingerie is also known as a torsolette, and is used in bridal lingerie, much like the bustier.

The original merry widow was a corselet incorporating slim panels of black, elastic yarn netting. A heavy-duty zipper was inserted behind a velvet-backed hook-and-eye flange, and the entire garment was lined with nylon voile. Nine long, spiral wires were encased in black satin.

Lana Turner, star of the 1952 film adaptation of The Merry Widow, is reported to have said in 1989, "I'm telling you, the merry widow was designed by a man. A woman would never do that to another woman."

=== Interval and rebirth ===
Around 1960, tights and trousers began to replace corselets. However, Maidenform and other mainstream lingerie and undergarment manufacturers have sold corselets as "control slips" since around 1975.

== Variations and relatives ==
- A short corselet without garters or shoulder straps, which ends above the waist, is a bustier (covering the bust)
- A long corselet extending over the hips, with or without garters and/or shoulder straps, is a torsolette (covering the torso)
- A corselet in two parts is a brassiere and a girdle.
- A corselet with a stiff back and laces is a corsage or a corset.
- A soft corselet is a slip.

== Other than apparel ==
In biology, the term refers to the thorax of an insect, or a protective band of enlarged scales in the shoulder region of a fish.
