= Girdle (undergarment) =

Form-fitting foundation garment

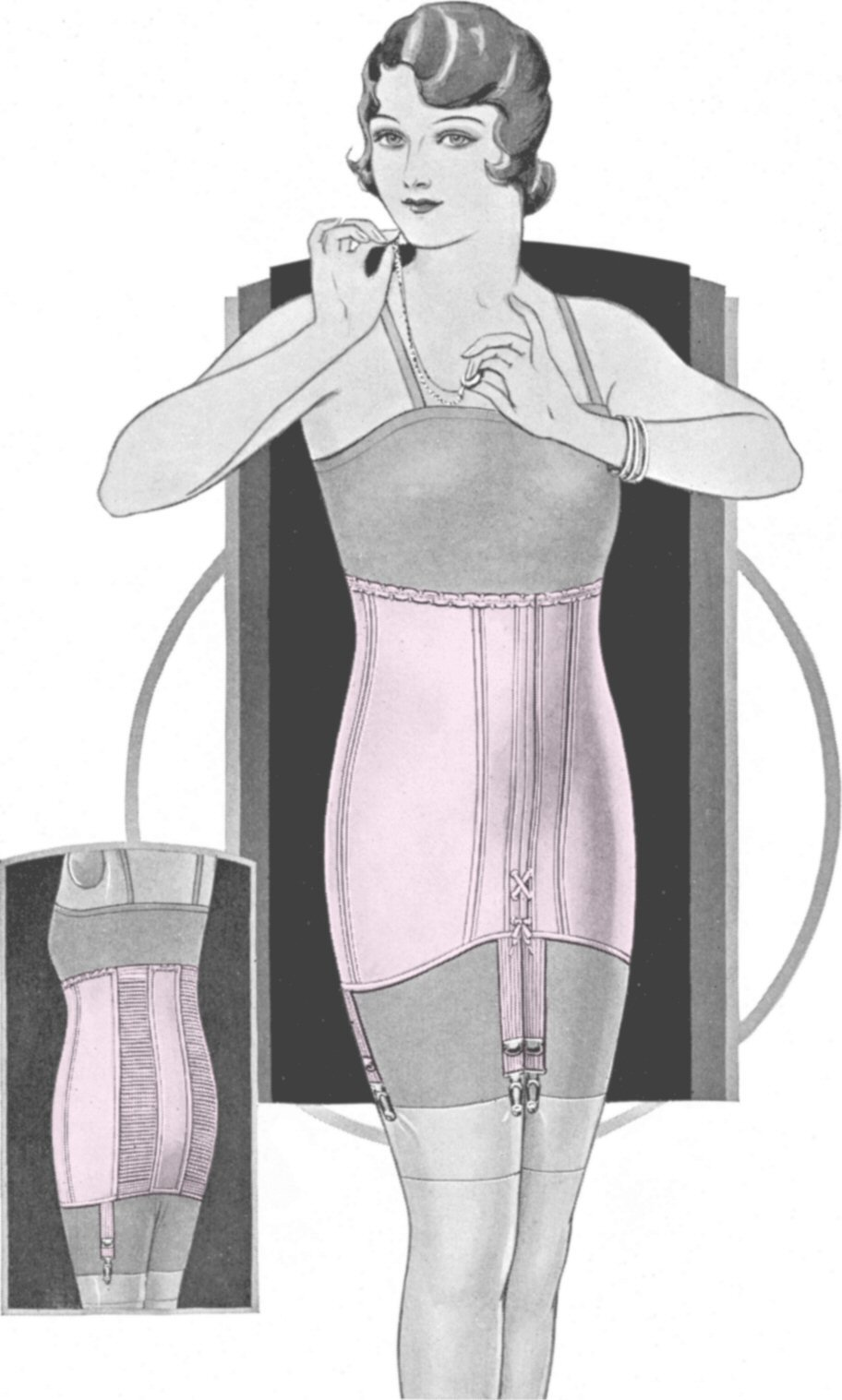
A woman's girdle (in pink), 1933.

A girdle is a form-fitting foundation garment that encircles the lower torso, extending below the hips, and worn often to shape or for support. It may be worn for aesthetic or medical reasons. In sports or medical treatment, a girdle may be worn as a compression garment. This form of women's foundation replaced the corset in popularity, and was in turn to a larger extent surpassed by pantyhose in the 1960s.

== Evolution from the corset ==
During the 1890s, the silhouette and use of the corset began to change. It became longer and S-shaped, with more emphasis on control for the waist and the top of the thighs. The newer foundation garment extended from the waist to the hips and stomach. The term girdle began to be used to identify this type of undergarment around the time of the First World War. Around this time, rubberized elastic was introduced. Women now wore two new types of foundations, the two-way stretch girdle and the cup-type brassiere, both more comfortable than their predecessor, the boned corset.

Girdles were constructed of elasticized fabric and sometimes fastened with hook and eye closures. In the 1960s, the now traditional longer model did not suit the new styles. A more compact panty girdle was designed to work with the shorter skirts. Pantyhose were not only more comfortable than girdles, there was no need for suspender clips to hold up stockings.

== 1960s and later ==
By 1970, the girdle was generally supplanted by the wearing of pantyhose (called tights in British English). Pantyhose replaced girdles for most women who had used the girdle as a means of holding up stockings; however, many girdle wearers continued to use a brief style panty-girdle under or on top of tights/pantyhose for some figure control. By the late 1970s, those who wanted figure control had the option of "control top" pantyhose, where the top section of the pantyhose had a higher proportion of elastane lycra to offer some figure control.

In 1968, at the feminist Miss America protest, protestors symbolically threw a number of feminine products into a "Freedom Trash Can". These included girdles, which were among items the protestors called "instruments of female torture" and accoutrements of what they perceived to be enforced femininity.

== Shapewear today ==
Girdles and "body shapers" are still worn by women to shape their figure with a garment. Indeed, the 21st century has seen a large resurgence of shapewear being worn, specially with the advent of new fabrics and seamless construction, so that modern shapewear is substantially more comfortable than its corsetry based garments from the previous century. Some of these garments may incorporate a brassiere, a combination known traditionally as a corselette, but generally now referred to as a "body" (or body shaper), or simply an "all-in-one".

== In literature ==
The 20th century women's girdle attracts various references in literature, often in a disparaging way. For example, Marilyn French in her classic book, The Women's Room, is very critical not only of the girdle itself, but also of the virtual compulsion to wear one, a compulsion which existed until the late 1960s. In John Masters's Bhowani Junction, once the mixed-race Victoria Jones decides to opt for an Indian rather than British persona, she rejects her girdle as a "western garment".
