= Bone (corsetry) =

Strip of rigid material used to stiffen corsets

In corsetry, a bone is one of the rigid parts of a corset that forms its frame and gives it rigidity. The purpose of the boning in a corset varies slightly from era to era. Generally, the cinching/shaping properties of corsetry puts strain onto the fabric from which the corset is made. The boning supports the desired shape and prevents wrinkling of the corset fabric. Bones, and the substances used for the purpose, are generically called "boning"; however, the name likely arises from the use of whalebone in early corsets.

Modern corset boning comes in two different qualities: the more durable metal and less durable plastic. Since the turn of the 20th century, steel boning was the standard for a high quality corset, coming in two different types: flat spring steel and spiral steel. While spring steel is most preferred for being thin and flexible, it only has the ability to bend in a single direction. Spiral steel is able to bend both horizontally and vertically, its only drawbacks being the fact that it's not as stable and tends to not support larger figures.

Traditionally, plastic boning such as Rigilene has been considered low quality and unsupportive. New advances in plastic boning have brought about synthetic whalebone. It is used widely in historical reconstruction due to its similarities to traditional whalebone. It is lightweight and very supportive. It also molds better to the body, allowing for a much curvier shape.

== Purpose, history and materials ==
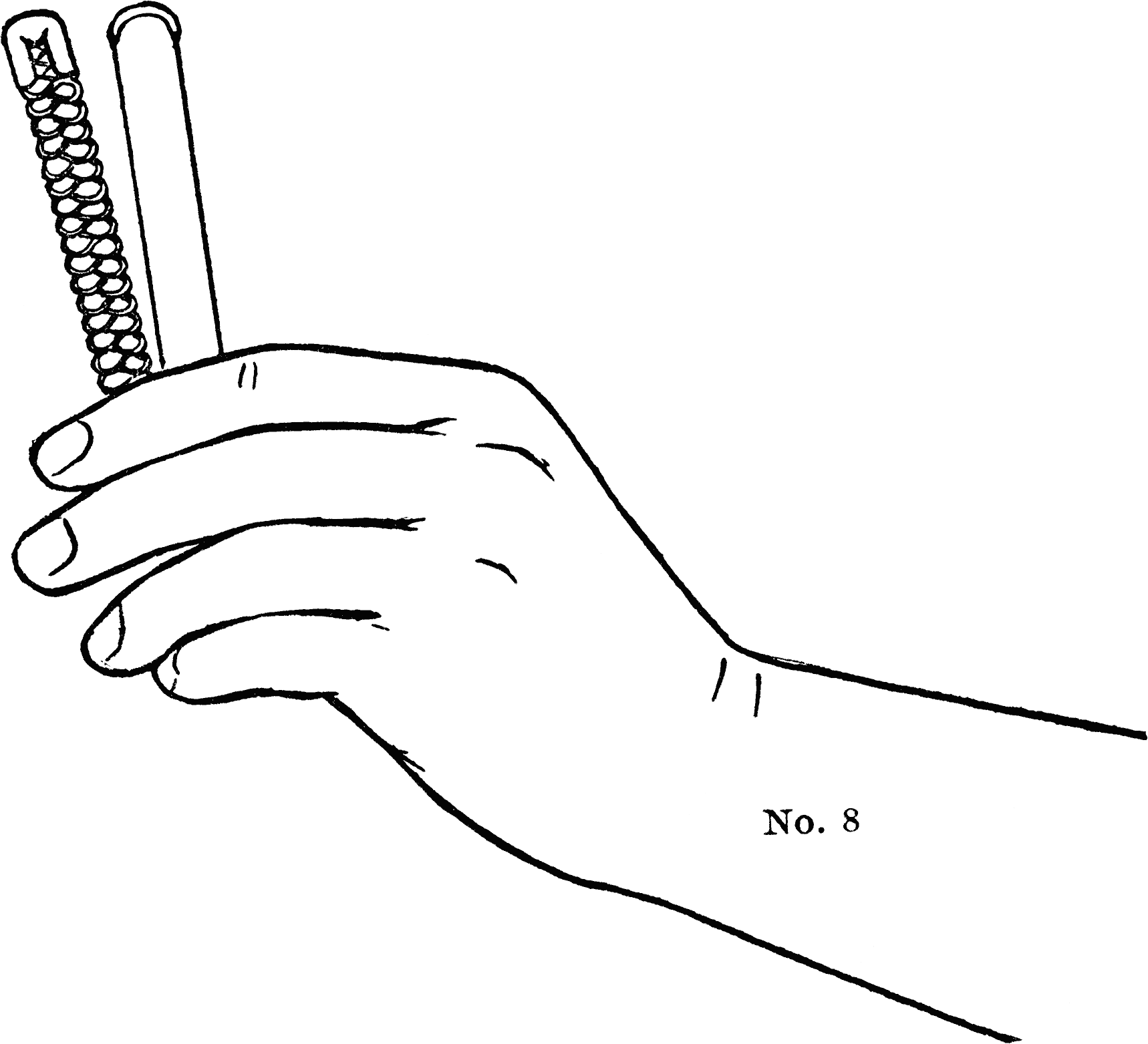
Spirella side by side with a piece of flat stay

The purpose of the boning in a corset varied slightly from era to era. Generally, the cinching/shaping properties of corsetry puts strain onto the fabric from which the corset is made. The boning supports the desired shape and prevents wrinkling of the corset fabric. Bones, and the substances used for the purpose, are generically called boning.

The corsets of the 16th through 18th centuries (called "stays", "bodies", or "corps") were intended to mold the upper torso into a rigid, cone-like shape. The earliest corsets had a wooden busk placed down the center fronts of the corsets; these early busks were different from the more modern steel busks which have clasps to facilitate opening and closing the corset from the front. Corsets of the 17th and 18th centuries were most often heavily boned, with little or no space between the bone channels. This was necessary to force the body to conform to the desired shape of the era. At the time, the most popular materials used for boning were giant reeds or whalebone. Whalebone was the most commonly-used and most expensive material.

The early 19th century brought a very different style of corset (still called "stays"). A return to the natural or "classical" form was embraced by fashion, and for the first time in corset history, the bust was separated. To achieve and enhance the separation of the bust, the "busk" was used. The busk was essentially a large, rigid "popsicle stick"- shaped bone inserted into a casing down the center front of the corset. These busks were made from either wood, ivory, bone, or baleen, and were often elaborately carved and given as gifts. It was most often the only bone within corsets of this type, as other required shaping was provided by the cut of the pattern and enhanced by cording (cotton or similar cords within casings). The cording of the early 19th-century corsets (stays) was often very elaborate, and many examples of corded stays can be found in museum collections.

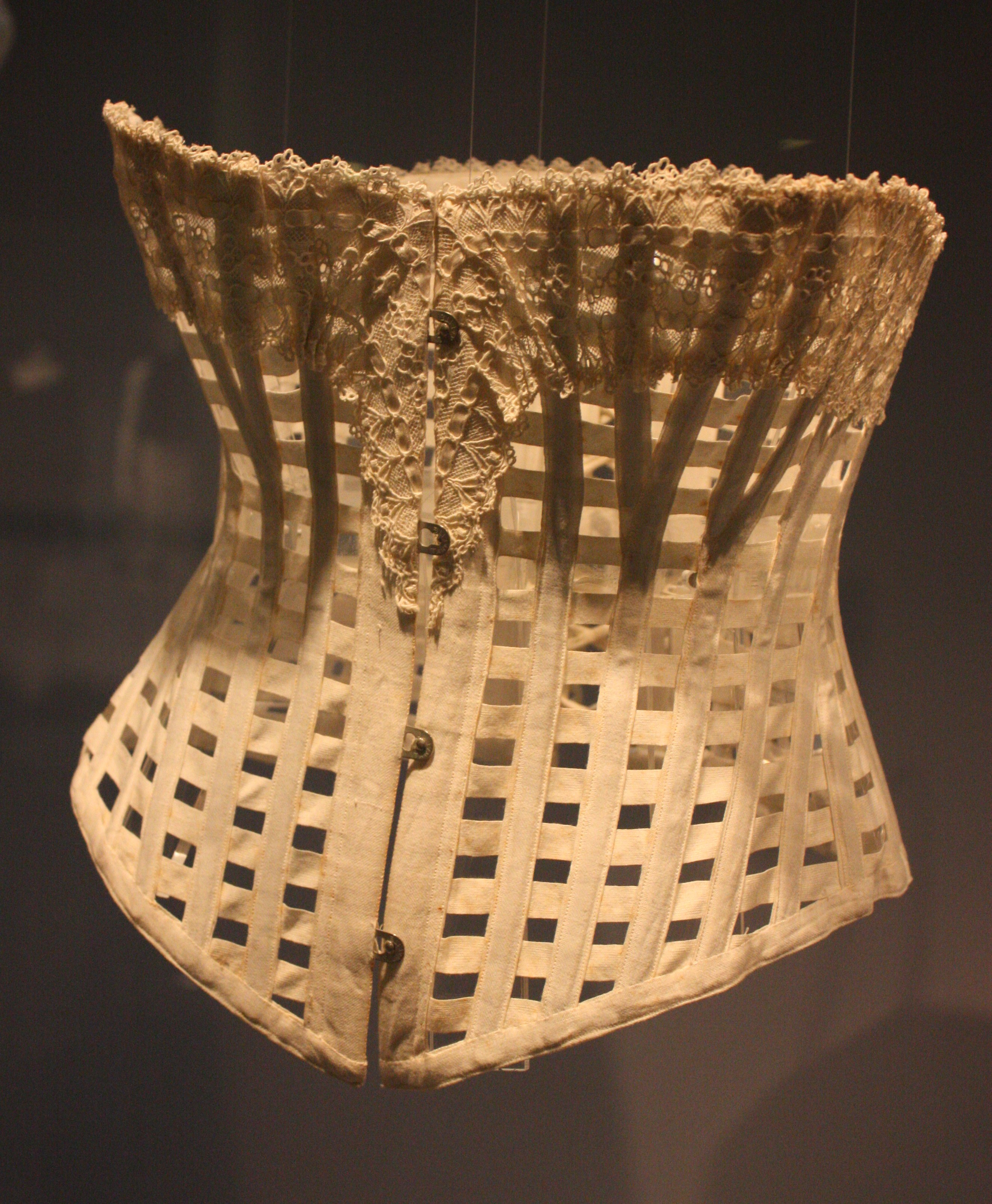
English "ventilated" corset of whalebone and cotton, late 19th century (Victoria and Albert Museum)

The mid-19th century brought more complex corsets (no longer called stays) and tighter lacing, which required more boning to create the desired shape. The modern split busk was popular, as it allowed corsets to easily open in the front. Steel and baleen (whalebone) were the dominant materials for boning and were occasionally used together. By the last quarter of the 19th century, baleen was growing increasingly more expensive and becoming more difficult to acquire. This encouraged experimentation into types of materials used for boning. Some of the most popular alternatives were cork strips, cording, watchspring steel, Coraline, and Featherbone. Coraline was manufactured from the straight, stiff fibers of the Mexican ixtle plant, bound together by two strands of thread wrapped in opposite directions. Featherbone was manufactured from the quills of feathers. The extremely rigid and elongated torso popular in the 1880s to early 1890s required extensive boning to support and enhance the steam-molded and starched corsets of the period.

By the late 1890s, a lighter, shorter style of corset was becoming popular, coming in simpler shapes and using much less boning than in the previous decade. This style of corset quickly evolved into the beautifully complex early Edwardian style corsets. These corsets from 1901–1908 relied heavily on the complex cut of the pattern to create and accentuate the shape. Boning was used wholly for the support of the shape created by the cut of the fabric. Bones were most commonly made of steel by this time, and were often placed in pairs within casings that did not follow the placement of the corset's seams. By the 1910s, the cut of corsets had become longer, although less complex, and boning became merely a means to keep the corset's fabric taut. By the mid-1910s to 1930s, the emphasis was placed on comfort and the rigid steel boning was almost completely replaced by the more flexible spiral steel boning.

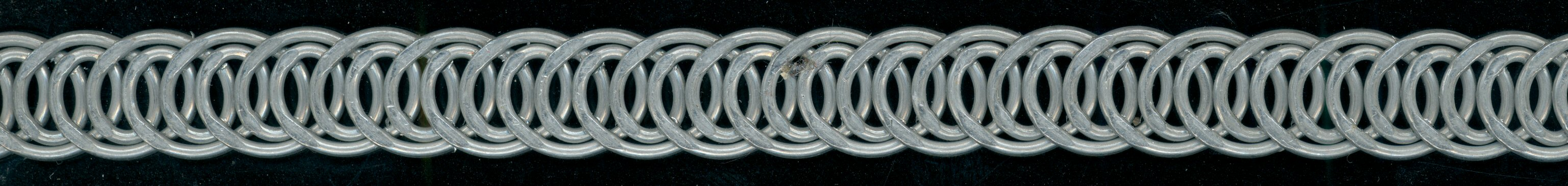
10mm Spiral Stay

Modern steel bones come in two basic varieties: "flat" steel boning (sometimes called just "enamel" or "rigid" boning) and "spiral" steel boning. Spiral boning is flattish but thicker than flat boning, because of the tips required on the ends. Flat boning bends in only one direction, while spiral steel boning bends easily in two directions. Spiral steel boning may thus be used in curved channels, or where a more gentle support is acceptable. Both varieties are rigid lengthwise. Modern corset makers differ greatly in the type and size of boning that they use. For those unable to procure steel boning, there are several alternative options, depending on the style of the corset desired. Cable ties (found in 36, 48 and 52 inch lengths) from a hardware store have been used by costumers.

Providing a much more flexible shape, synthetic whalebone comes in a variety of sizes. 4mmx1mm is most suitable for pre-19th century stays, especially fully boned stays. 6mmx1.5 is most suitable for 19th century corsets.
