= Pantalettes =

Undergarments covering the legs, worn by women and children

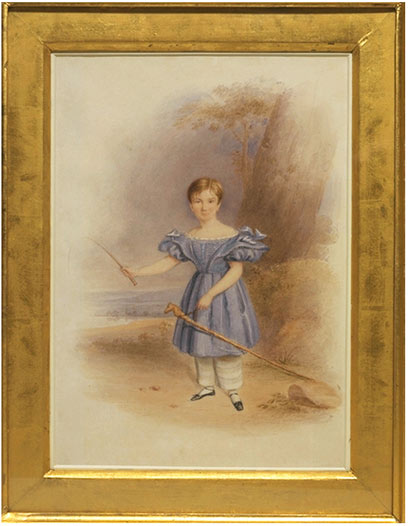
- Young boy in pantalettes, 1836.
- Type: Underwear

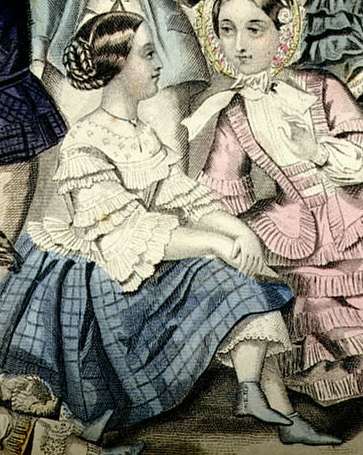
Girl's costume showing linen pantalettes from Godey's Lady's Book 1855

Pantalettes are undergarments covering the legs worn by women, girls, and very young boys (before they were breeched) in the early- to mid-19th century.

Pantalettes originated in France in the early 19th century, and quickly spread to the United Kingdom and the United States. Pantalettes were similar to leggings. They could be one-piece or two separate garments, one for each leg, attached at the waist with buttons or laces. The crotch was left open for hygiene reasons. They were most often of white linen fabric and could be decorated with tucks, lace, cutwork or broderie anglaise.

Ankle-length pantalettes for women were worn under the crinoline and hoop skirt to ensure that the legs were modestly covered should they become exposed. Pantalettes for children and young girls were mid-calf to ankle-length and were intended to show under their shorter skirts.

Until the mid-19th century, very young boys were commonly dressed in dresses, gowns and pantalettes, though these were commonly associated with girls' clothing, until the boys were breeched at any age between 2 and 8 years of age, and sometimes older. Young boys would be dressed in this fashion until at least they were toilet-trained.

== Cultural references ==
An Irish reel bears the title of "The Ladies' Pantalettes".

The US Virgin Islands folk song "Over the Side", records how smuggler and suffragist Ella Gifft used her pantalettes to hide the rum that she was illegally importing there, during the Prohibition era.

In the 1939 film Gone with the Wind Rhett Butler tells Scarlett O'Hara, upon his return from Paris, France, that pantalettes are out of style there.

== Gallery ==
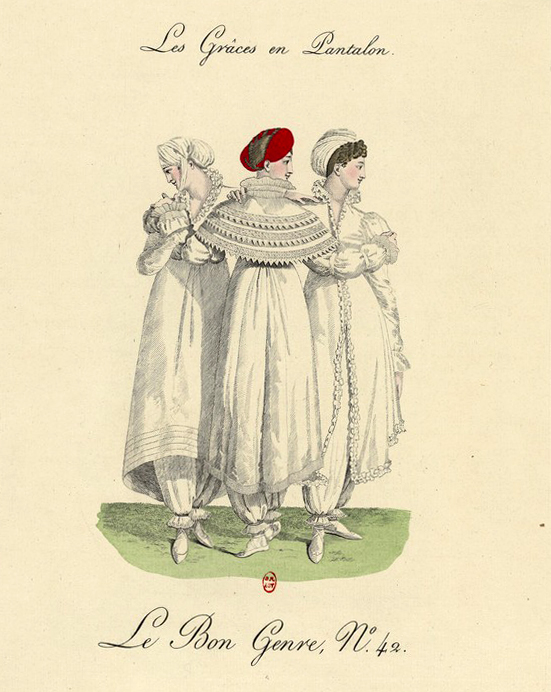
The three graces in pantalettes, ca 1800

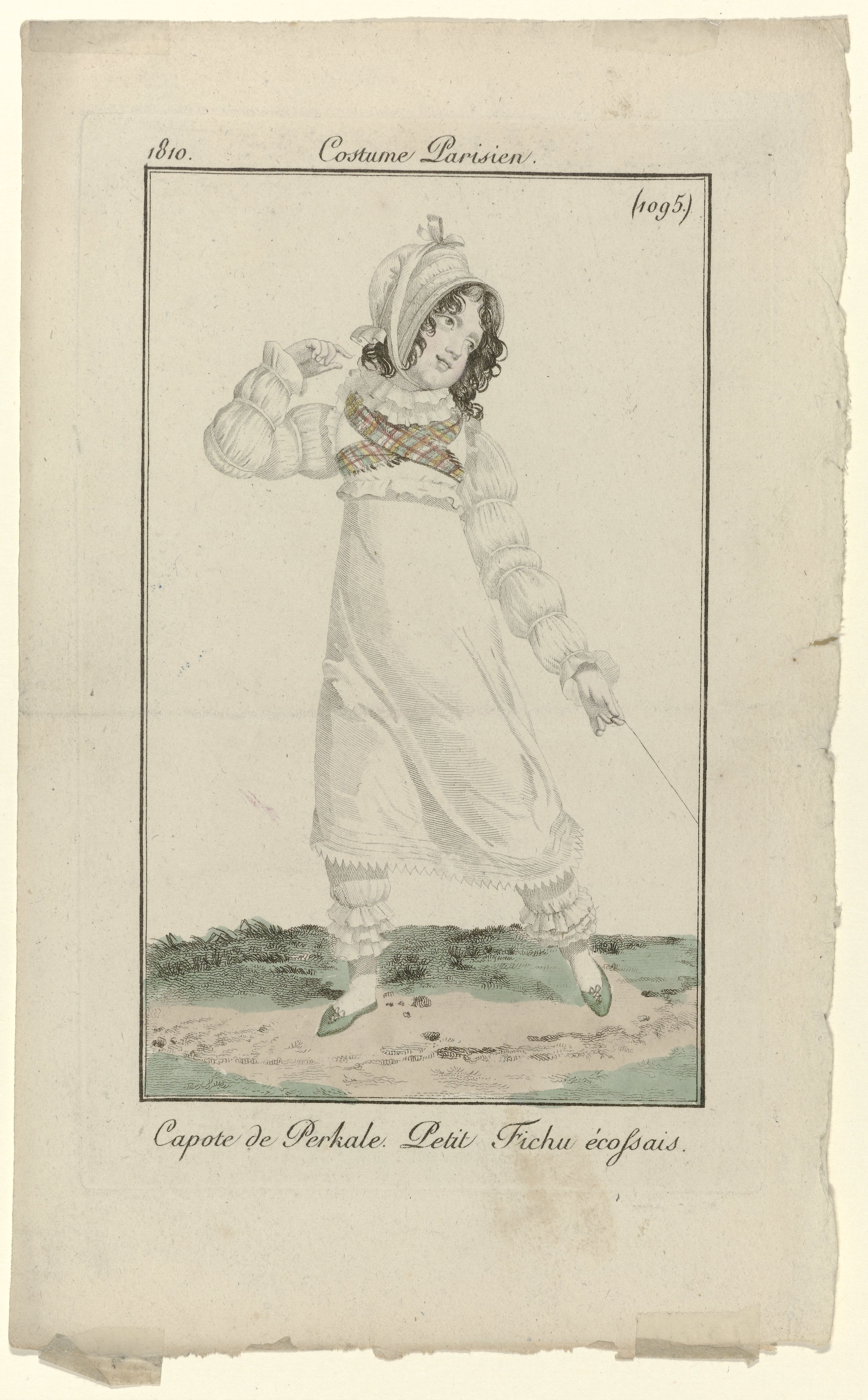
Girl, 1810

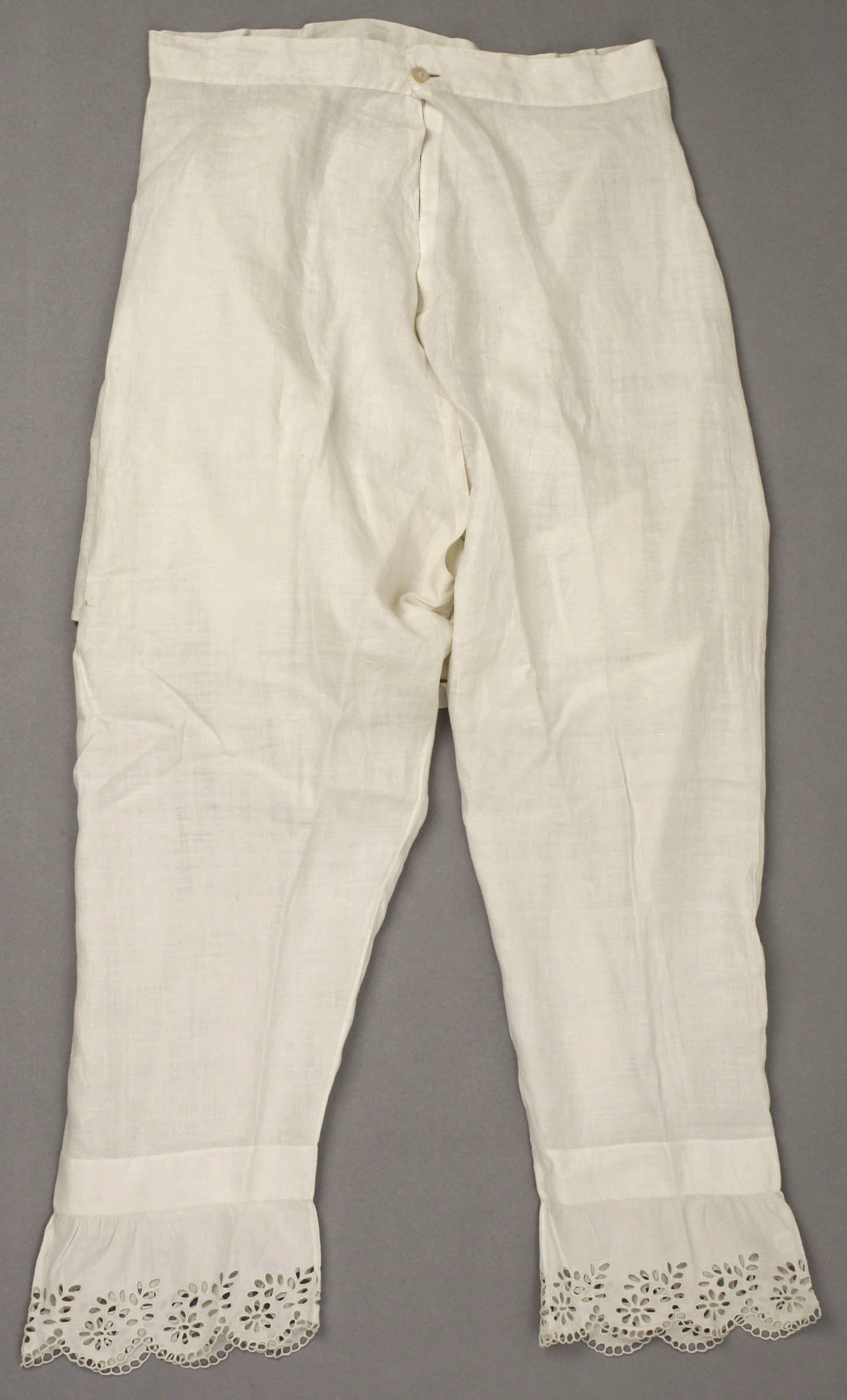
1830s

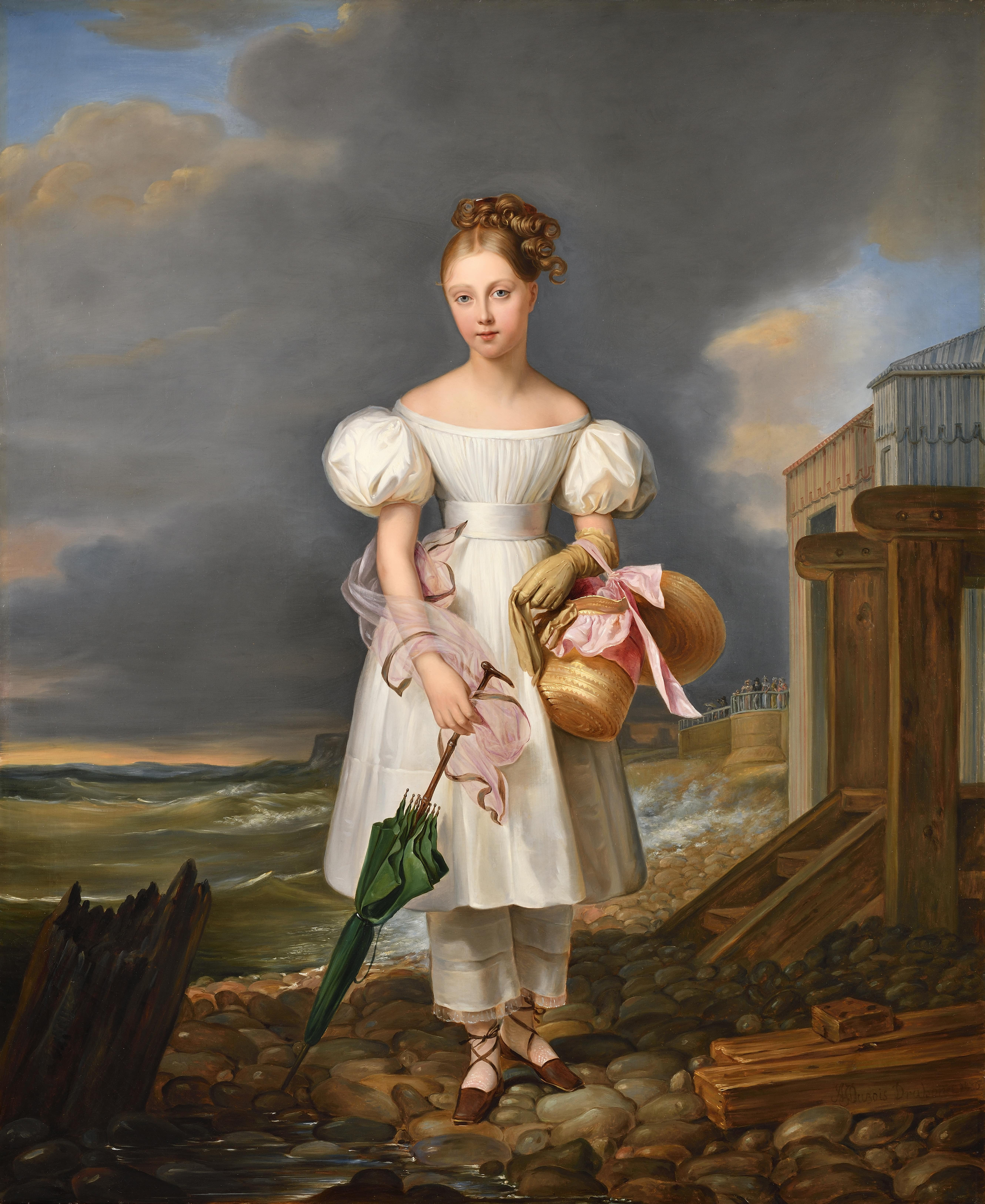
1830

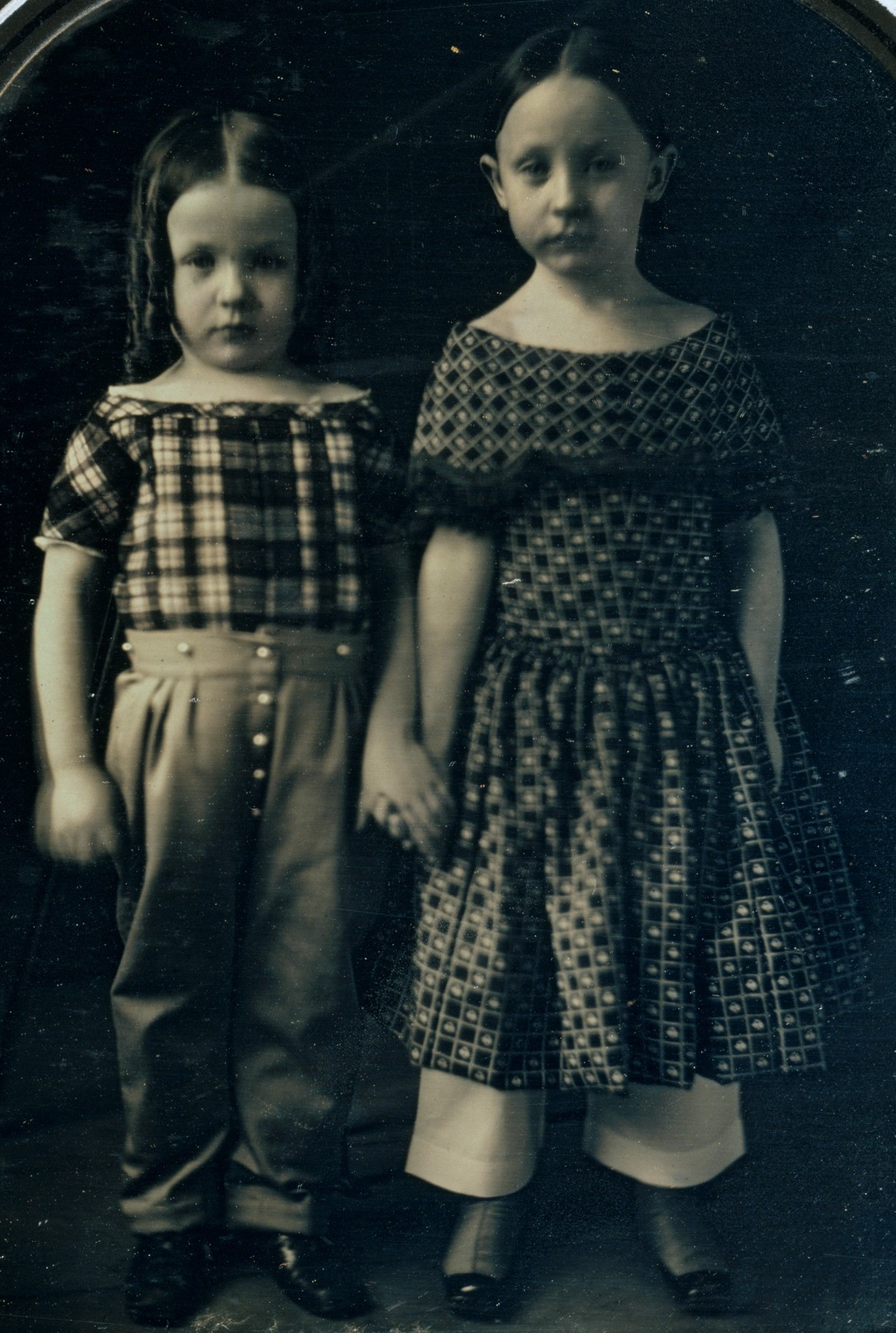
1850

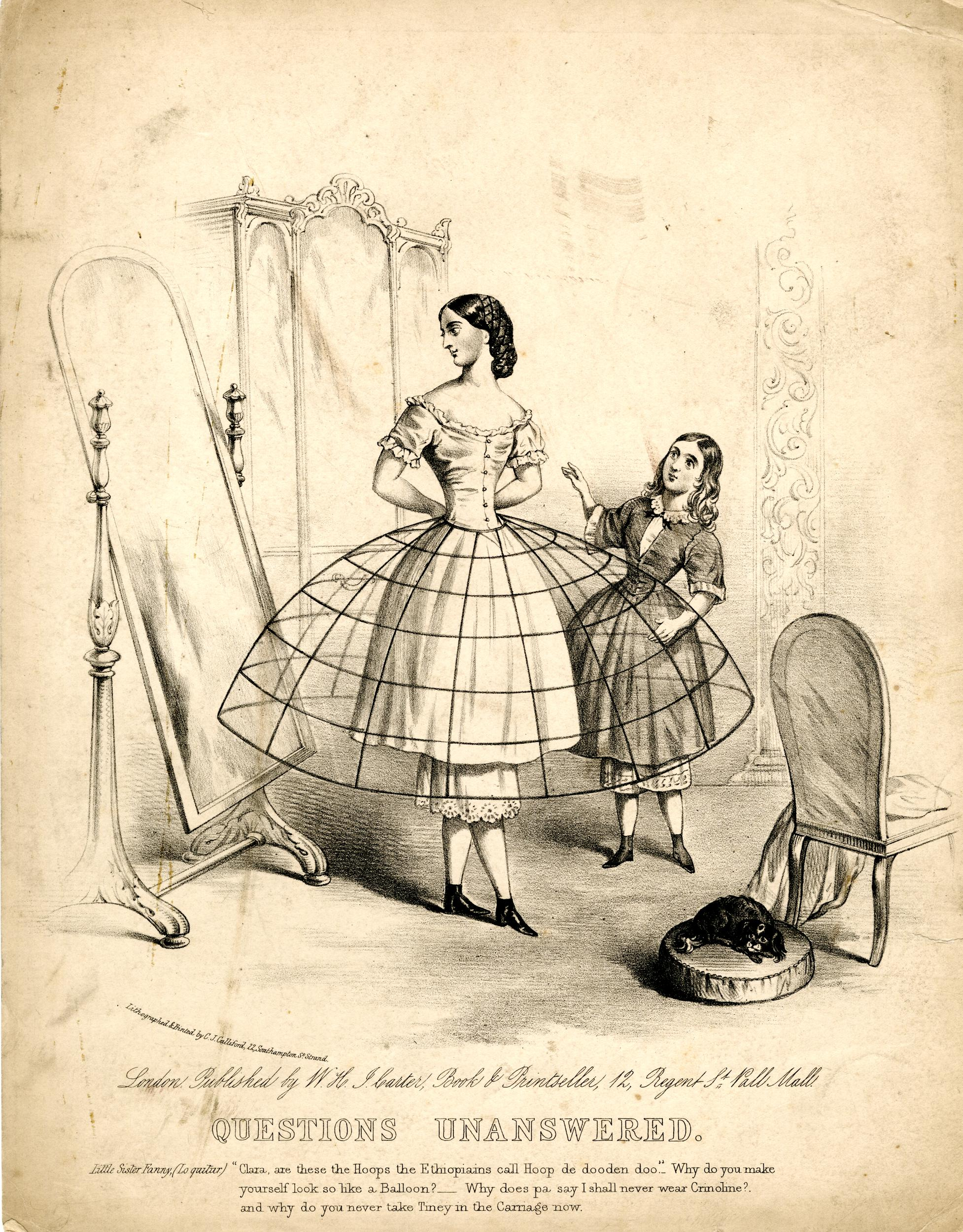
1850s

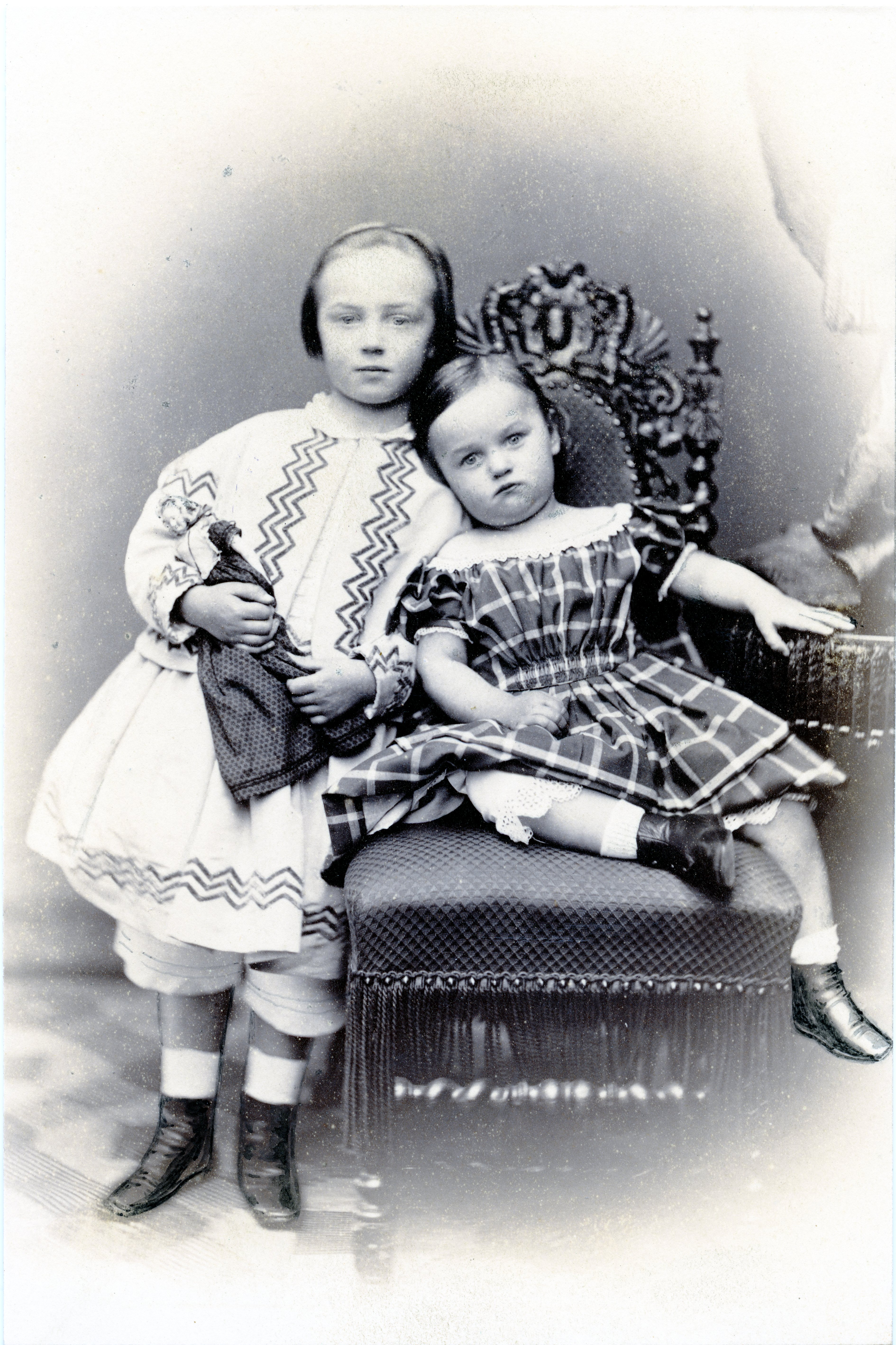
1866

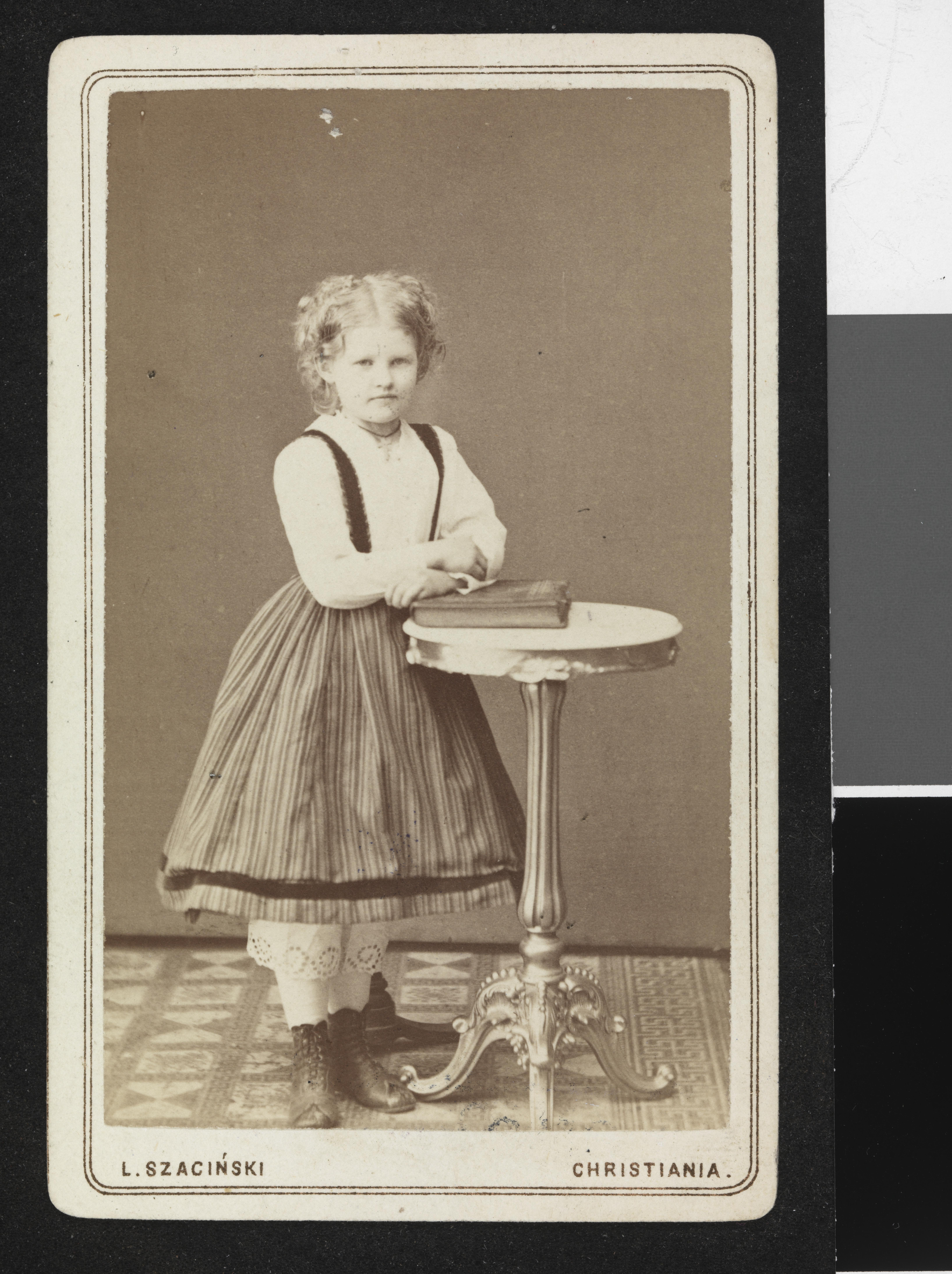
1872

== See also ==
- Leggings
- Undergarment
