= Skeleton suit =

Historical style of small boy's suit

Young boy in a short-sleeved skeleton suit, 1805–06. The buttons can be clearly seen. His companion is also a boy, wearing a dress.

A skeleton suit was an outfit of clothing for small boys, popular from about 1790 to the late 1820s, after which it increasingly lost favor with the advent of trousers. It consisted of a tight short- or long-sleeved coat or jacket buttoned to a pair of high-waisted trousers. Skeleton suits are often described as one of the earliest fashions to be specifically tailored for children, rather than being adult fashions sized down. Previously (and subsequently) young boys wore dresses until they were breeched, or put into trousers.

Charles Dickens describes a skeleton suit as "one of those straight blue cloth cases in which small boys used to be confined, before belts and tunics had come in, and old notions had gone out: an ingenious contrivance for displaying the full symmetry of a boy's figure, by fastening him into a very tight jacket, with an ornamental row of buttons over each shoulder, and then buttoning his trousers over it, so as to give his legs the appearance of being hooked on, just under the armpits" (Sketches by Boz, 1836). Despite Dickens' assertions, skeleton suits were made in various colors. They were usually worn with a white blouse or shirt trimmed with lace or ruffles.

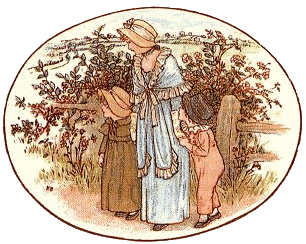
Illustration by Kate Greenaway, 1885, showing a small boy in a skeleton suit

Skeleton suits are one of the children's nostalgic Regency fashions typical of the illustrations of Kate Greenaway.
