= Bandvagn 206 =

Swedish articulated all-terrain carrier

Bandvagn 206 Bv 206 Armoured All Terrain Vehicle
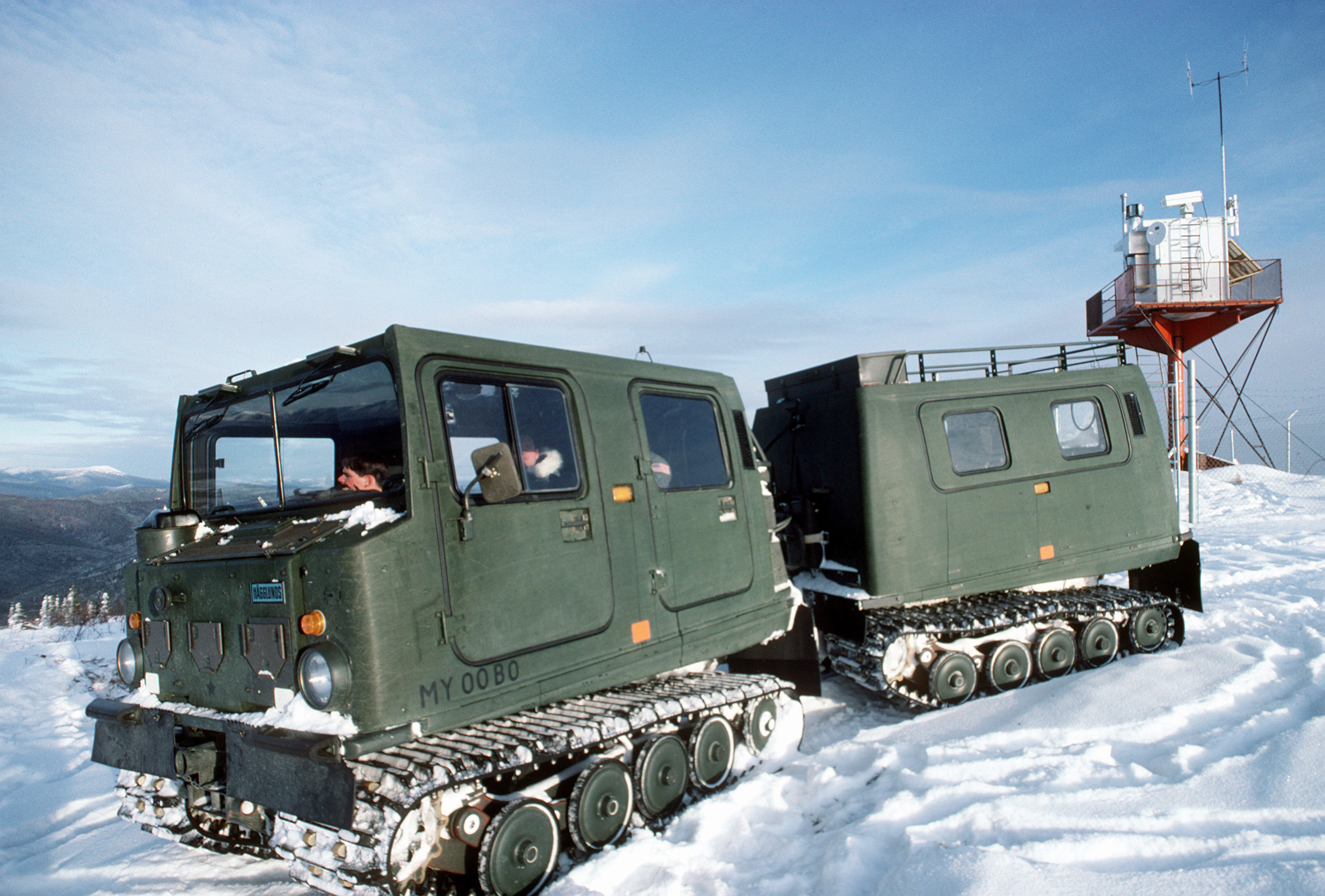
- US M973 SUSV
- Type: All-terrain vehicle
- Place of origin: Sweden

Service history
- Used by: See operators

Production history
- Manufacturer: Hägglund & Söner (1980–1997); Alvis plc (1997–2004); BAE Systems Hägglunds (2004–)
- Produced: 1980–
- No. built: 11,000+ (as of 2017)
- Variants: See variants

Specifications
- Mass: 4,500 kg (9,900 lb)
- Length: 6.9 m (22 ft 8 in)
- Width: 1.87 m (6 ft 2 in)
- Height: 2.4 m (7 ft 10 in)
- Crew: Driver + 5 passengers (front car)
- Passengers: 11 passengers (rear car)
- Main armament: Heavy machine gun on ring mount
- Secondary armament: Smoke grenade launchers (front), mortars (back)
- Engine: 2.8L 99 kW Ford Cologne V6; 99 kW (132 hp)
- Maximum speed: 65 km/h (40 mph) (roads); 5 km/h (3.1 mph) (water)

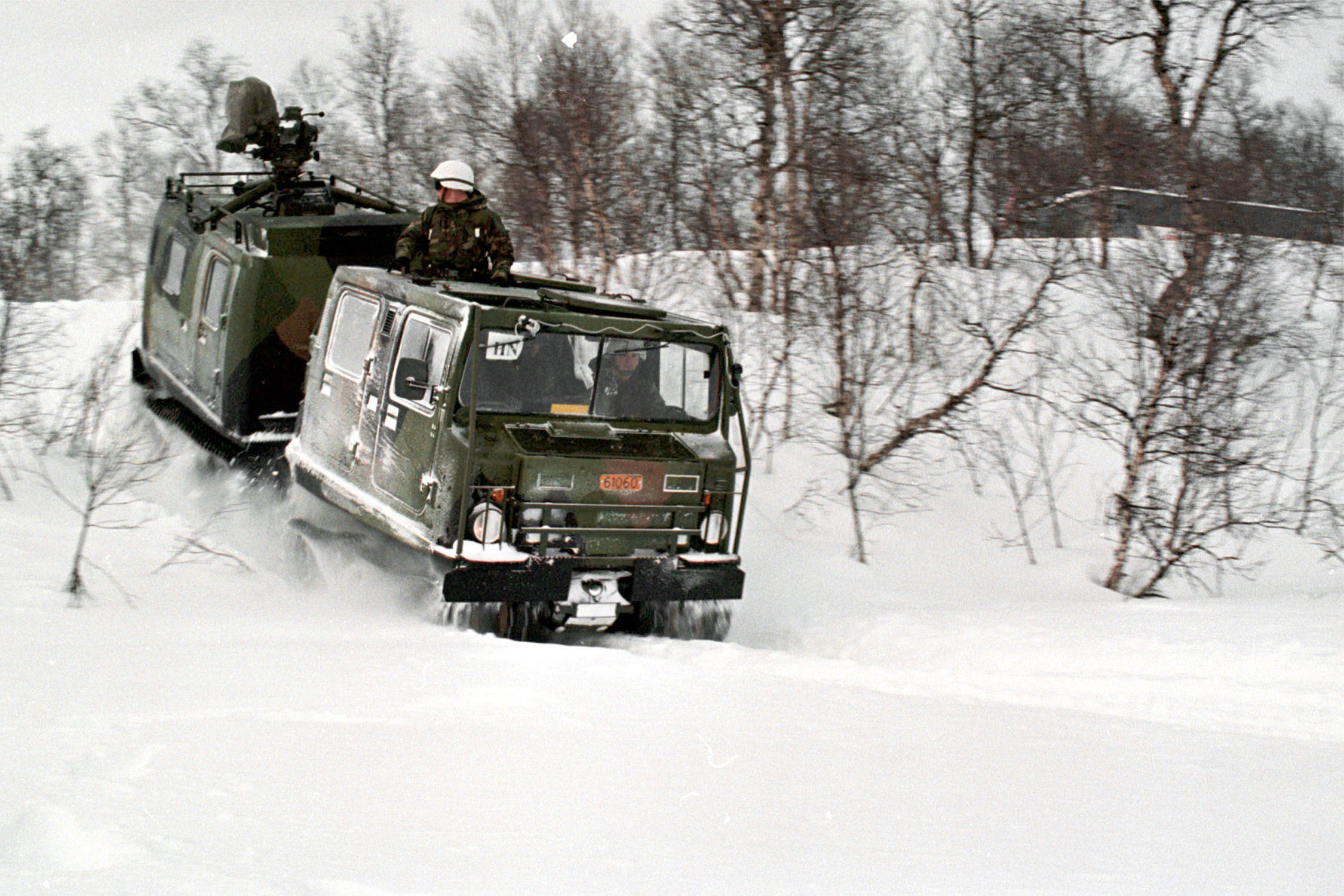
US Marines in a Norwegian bv 206 traveling through snow.

Bandvagn 206 (bv 206) (meaning "Tracked Vehicle 206" in English) is a tracked articulated, all-terrain carrier initially developed and manufactured by the Swedish company Hägglund & Söner, and subsequently by BAE Systems Hägglunds, for the Swedish Army. It consists of two units, with all four tracks powered. It can carry up to 17 people, 6 in the front compartment, 11 in the rear. The trailer unit can be adapted for different uses (see § Variants).

== History ==
Development of the bv 206 all-terrain articulated tracked carrier began in 1974. Three batches of trial vehicles were delivered by Hägglund & Söner between 1976 and 1978. The first production examples were delivered to the Swedish Defence Administration in 1980.

In 1997 the military vehicles business of Hägglund & Söner was acquired by Alvis plc, becoming Alvis Hägglunds. In turn, in 2004, Alvis became part of BAE Systems, with the business becoming BAE Systems Hägglunds.

== Description ==
Articulated steering on a bandvagn 206.

Like its predecessor, the Volvo Bv 202, the bv 206 is designed to carry troops and equipment through snow and bog-lands in northern Sweden. The low ground pressure enables the bv 206 to cope with a wide range of difficult conditions. It is fully amphibious, with a speed in water of up to 4.7 kilometres per hour (2.9 mph). Over 11,000 units have been produced and they are used in more than 37 countries worldwide.

The total load capacity is 2,250 kilograms (4,960 lb). A trailer of up to 2,500 kilograms (5,500 lb) gross weight can be towed behind the second compartment.

The bv 206 is referred to as a Small Unit Support Vehicle (SUSV) pronounced "susvee" in United States service. U.S. military variants include the standard model (M973), a tactical operations center variant (M1065), an ambulance variant (M1066) and a flat-bed cargo carrier (M1067). U.S. military models are fitted with a 6-cylinder Mercedes diesel engine and a non-halon fire suppression system since 1997 due to several cases where the front car caught fire and burned to the frame.

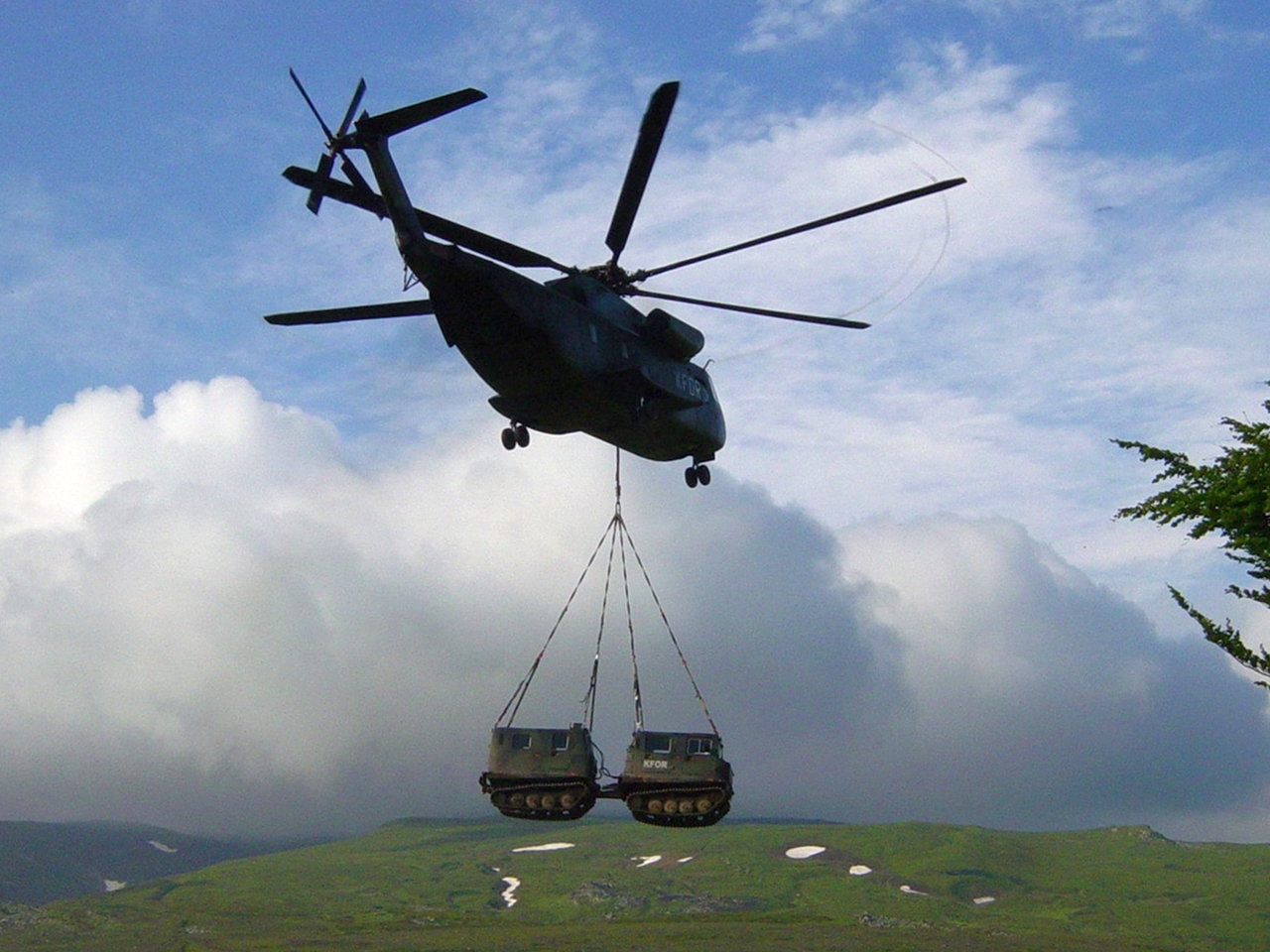
A bv 206D being transported by a German Army CH-53.

Users include the American and Australian Antarctic research organizations and British, Icelandic and Canadian search and rescue services. They are also used for search and rescue services in the Austrian alpine region. The bv 206 was used in combat by the Canadian Army during Operation Anaconda. The Singapore Armed Forces uses the bv 206, and recently transferred several of them to the Singapore Civil Defense Force for use as a firefighting platform.

Decommissioned units have been purchased by private owners and rented as transports, particularly in Alberta, Canada, to access remote oil wells, crew transport for wildfire, as well as cut blocks which need to be reforested by tree planting.

The bv 206 is used in Antarctica, Brazil, Canada, Chile, China, Estonia, Finland, France, Germany, Greece, Indonesia, Ireland, Israel, Italy, Lithuania, Latvia, Malaysia, Mexico, the Netherlands, New Zealand, Norway, Pakistan, Singapore, South Korea, Spain, Sweden, Thailand, Ukraine, the United Kingdom, and the United States.

== Variants ==
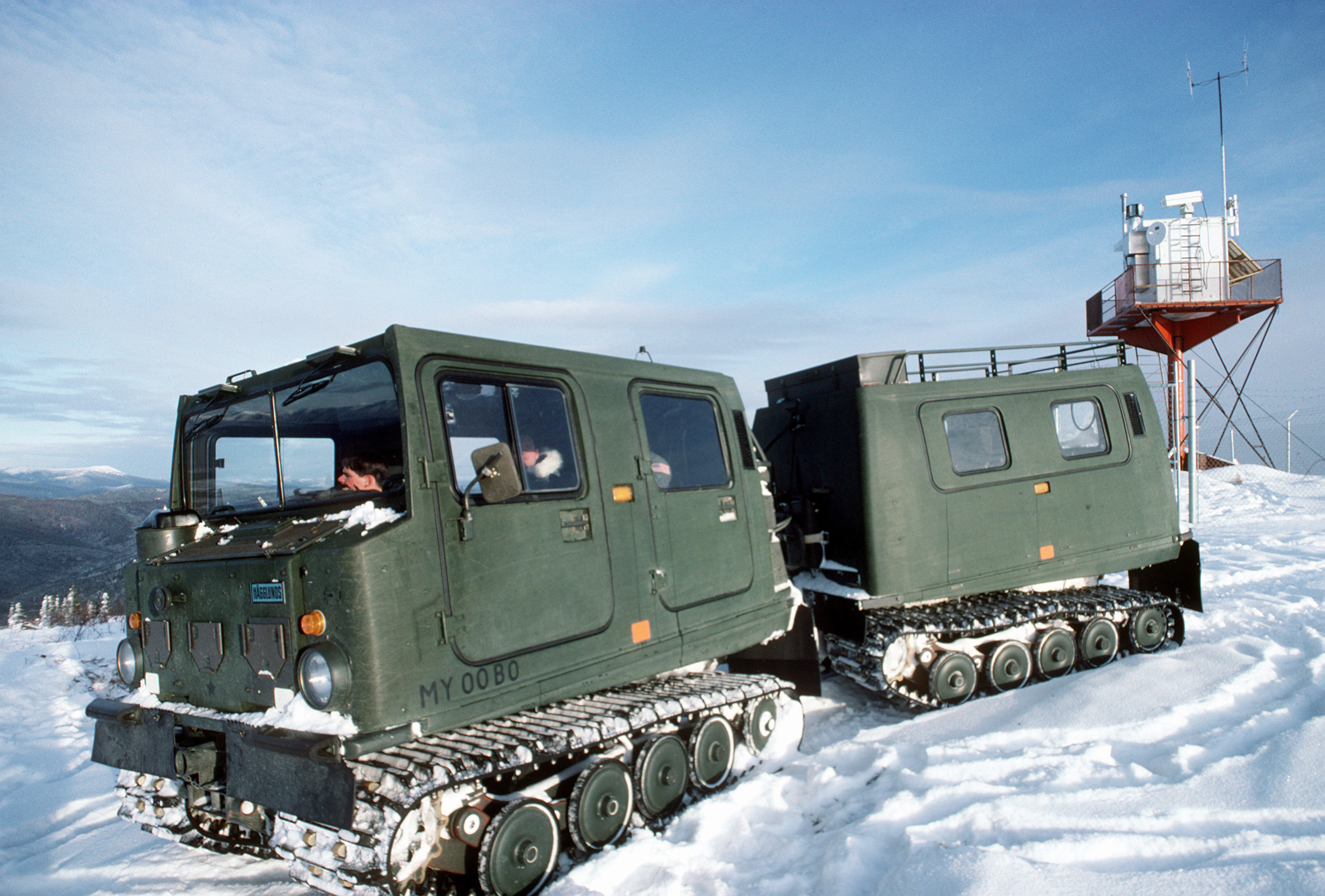
This tracked vehicle, a Swedish Hägglunds bv 206, achieves low ground pressure through full-length, wide rubber tracks and a lightweight body. The two sections of the vehicle are articulated, allowing it to keep contact with the ground over broken terrain. The ground pressure is low enough that the vehicle can traverse loose snow without sinking. The vehicle is amphibious and propelled in water by its tracks.

=== Bv 206x ===
Below follows common variants of the basic vehicle where most alternations consists of the equipment installed on the base vehicle.

==== Bv 206A ====
The Bv 206A is an ambulance version, which is capable of carrying stretchers in the rear compartment.

==== Bv 206F ====
The Bv 206F is a fire appliance variant.

==== RaBv 2061 ====
The RaBv 2061 (RadioBandvagn 2061) is a Swedish Army communications/command version, fitted with radio equipment and workplaces for staff members.

==== RlBv 2068 ====
Signalist version of the Bv 206 with radio relay capability. The vehicle is outfitted with mission specific equipment that allows it to fill different functions in the Swedish military telecommunications network Telenät 2000. It was used on the brigade and divisional echelons of the Swedish Army.

==== Other variants ====
These include mortar carrier, cargo carrier, fuel carrier, radar and command post. The units can easily be customized to meet customer requirements.

=== PvBv 2062 ===
The PvBv 2062 (PansarvärnsBandvagn 2062) is a Swedish Army anti-tank vehicle, an open top version of the Bv 206 roll-bars that can be lowered to operate the 90 mm Pvpj 1110 recoilless anti-tank gun.

==== PvBv 2063 ====
The PvBv 2063 (PansarvärnsBandvagn 2063) is another Swedish Army anti-tank vehicle, similar to the PvBv 2062, but fitted with the launch system for an ATGM, either the TOW (Rbs 55) or the Bofors BILL (Rbs 56).

=== Bv 206S ===
Bandvagn 206 Skyddad (protected) is an armoured personnel carrier variant based on the bv 206 platform, which provides protection from shrapnel and small arms fire for the occupants. It is in service with the armed forces of France, Germany (379 bv 206D/S ordered), Spain, Netherlands, Italy (158 units), Sweden (93 units), Greece (Bv 208) and Singapore (300 units), which has replaced it with the Bronco All Terrain Tracked Carrier.

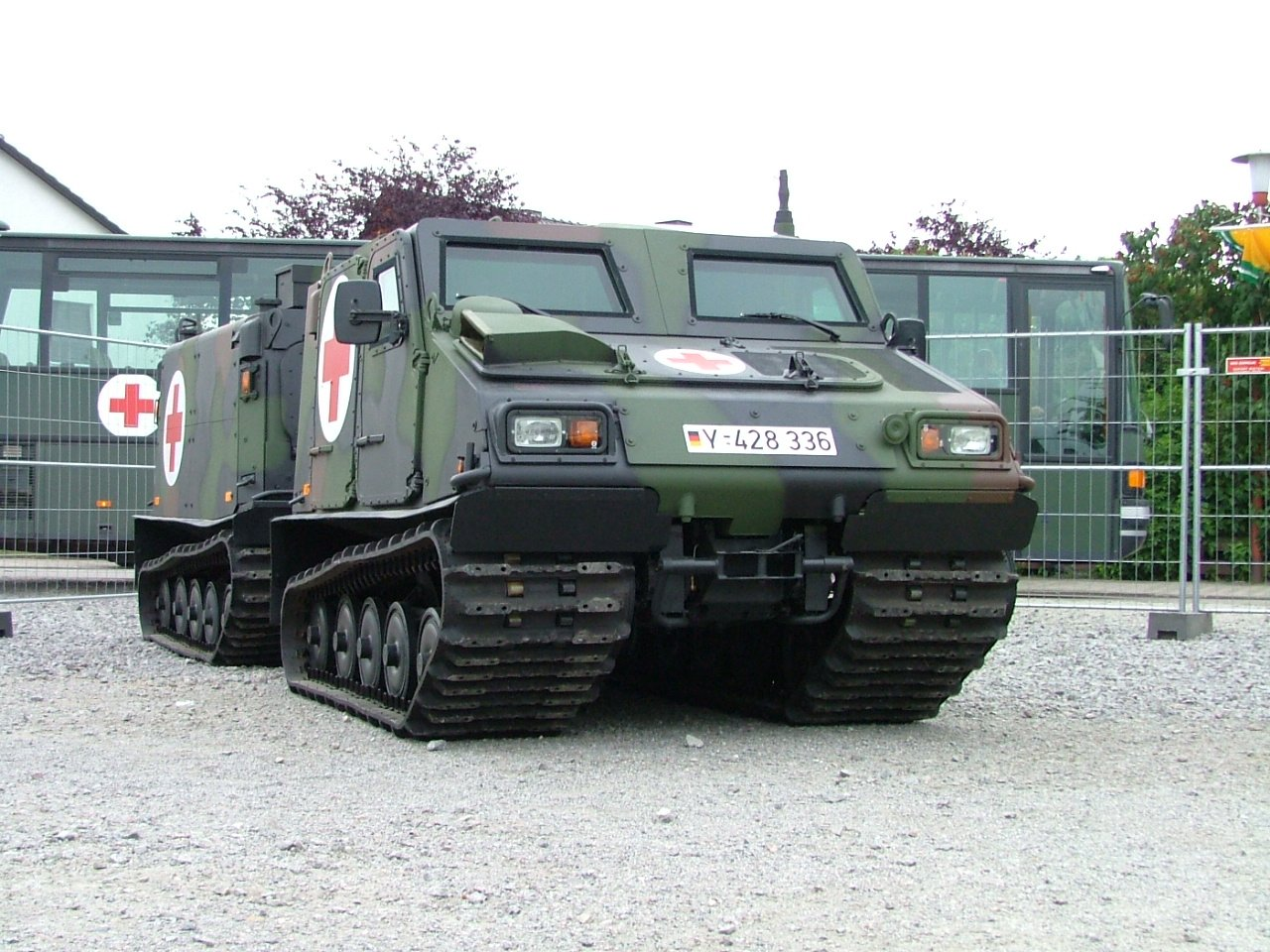
An armored bv 206S ambulance of the German Army.

Using a Steyr M1-"Monoblock" engine (6-cylinder, 130 kW), the vehicle can carry the driver and 12 combat-equipped troops — four in the front compartment and eight in the rear. The bv 206S can be underslung and airlifted by Boeing CH-47 Chinook and Sikorsky CH-53E Super Stallion helicopters or carried in the C-130 Hercules airplane, amongst others.

Canadian troops taking part in Operation Anaconda in Afghanistan made good use of this vehicle, riding over rough mountainous terrain with full combat gear, allowing the men to avoid the exhaustion they would have felt moving on foot at such high altitudes and in such conditions.

The UK is looking to replace its bv 206Ds by 2020.

=== GAZ-3351 ===
Produced in Russia under license from Hägglunds by the GAZ Group at the Zavolzhsky Plant Of Caterpillar Tractors. Uses a 6-cylinder Steyr M16 turbodiesel engine.

=== BvS 10 ===
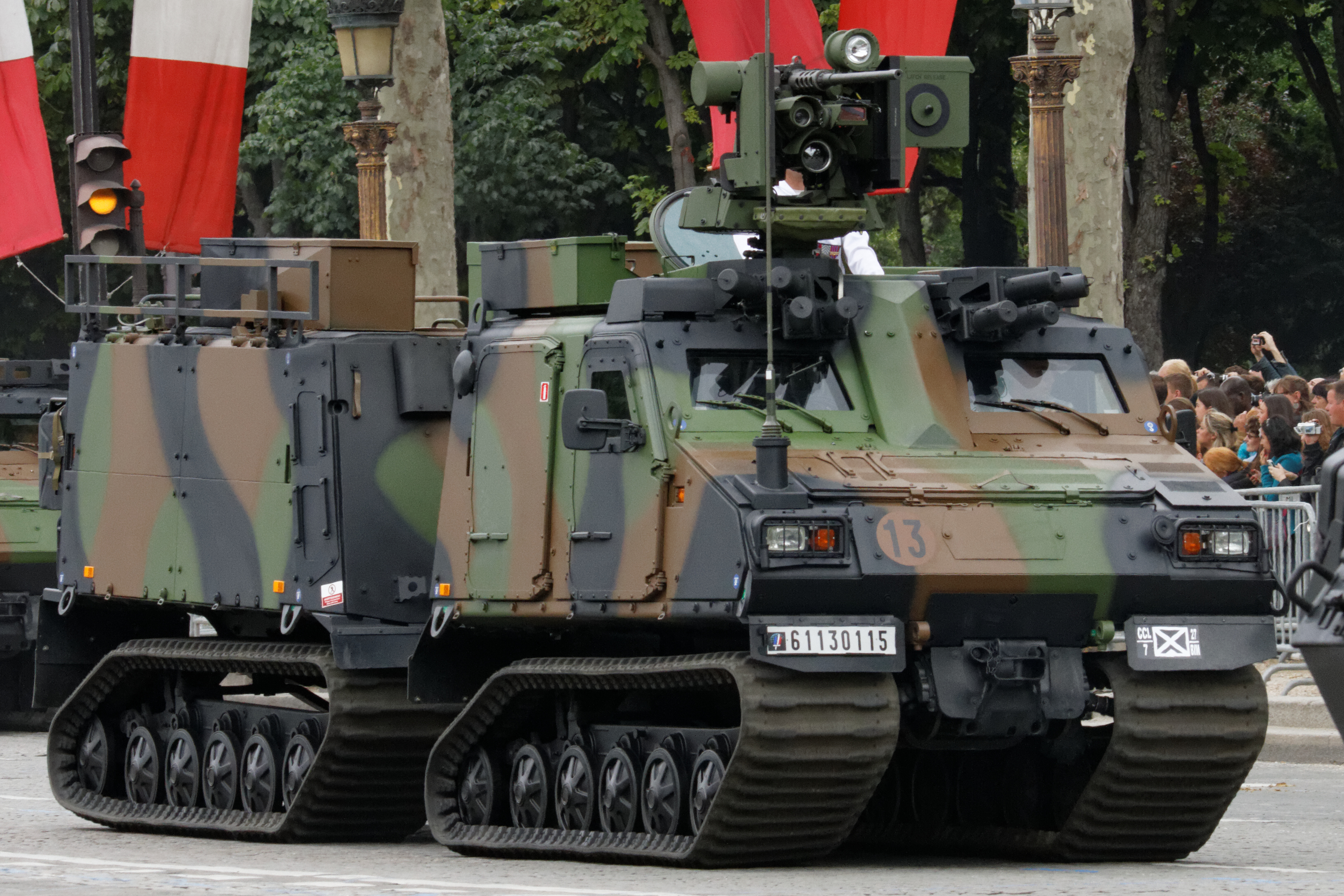
BvS 10 of the French Army

The BvS 10, not to be confused with the bv 206 or bv 206S, is a much larger but still fully amphibious armoured vehicle based upon the characteristic twin-cab, articulated steering system typical of Hägglunds all-terrain vehicles. It is equipped with a 6-cylinder Steyr M1 engine with 200 kW. It was originally designed for the British Royal Marines Commandos and named All Terrain Vehicle (Protected) - ATV(P) VIKING.

It is in service with the Royal Marines Armoured Support Group and the Royal Netherlands Marine Corps. The French Army have recently ordered 130 Bvs10s. The Austrian Armed Forces 32 BvS10AUT represents the most modern variant with full vehicle and crew protection and a 12.7 mm remote-controlled weapon station. It is also planned for the Italian Army.

=== BvS 10 Beowulf ===
The BvS 10 Beowulf is essentially an unarmored version of the BvS 10 Viking.

== Specifications (original version) ==
A diagram of the bv 206

- Engine: 2.8L, 99 kW Ford Cologne V6.
- Gearbox: MB W 4A-018 automatic transmission
- Weight: 4,500 kilograms (9,900 lb)
- Cargo load: 2,240 kilograms (4,940 lb) - 630 kilograms (1,390 lb) in front unit and 1,610 kilograms (3,550 lb) in trailer unit)
- Length: 6.9 metres (23 ft)
- Width: 1.87 metres (6.1 ft)
- Height: 2.4 metres (7.9 ft)

== Operators ==
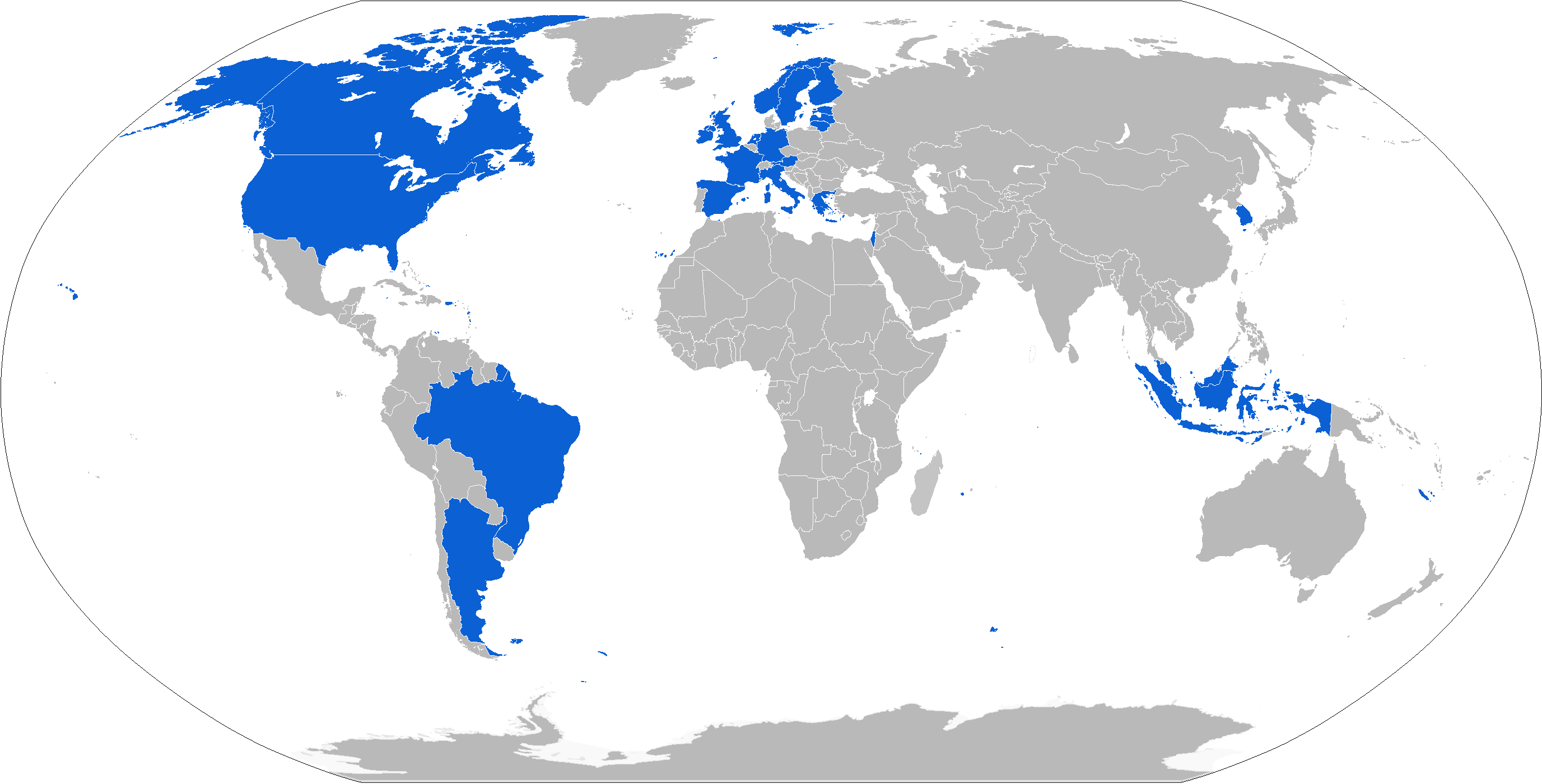
A map of bandvagn 206 operators in blue

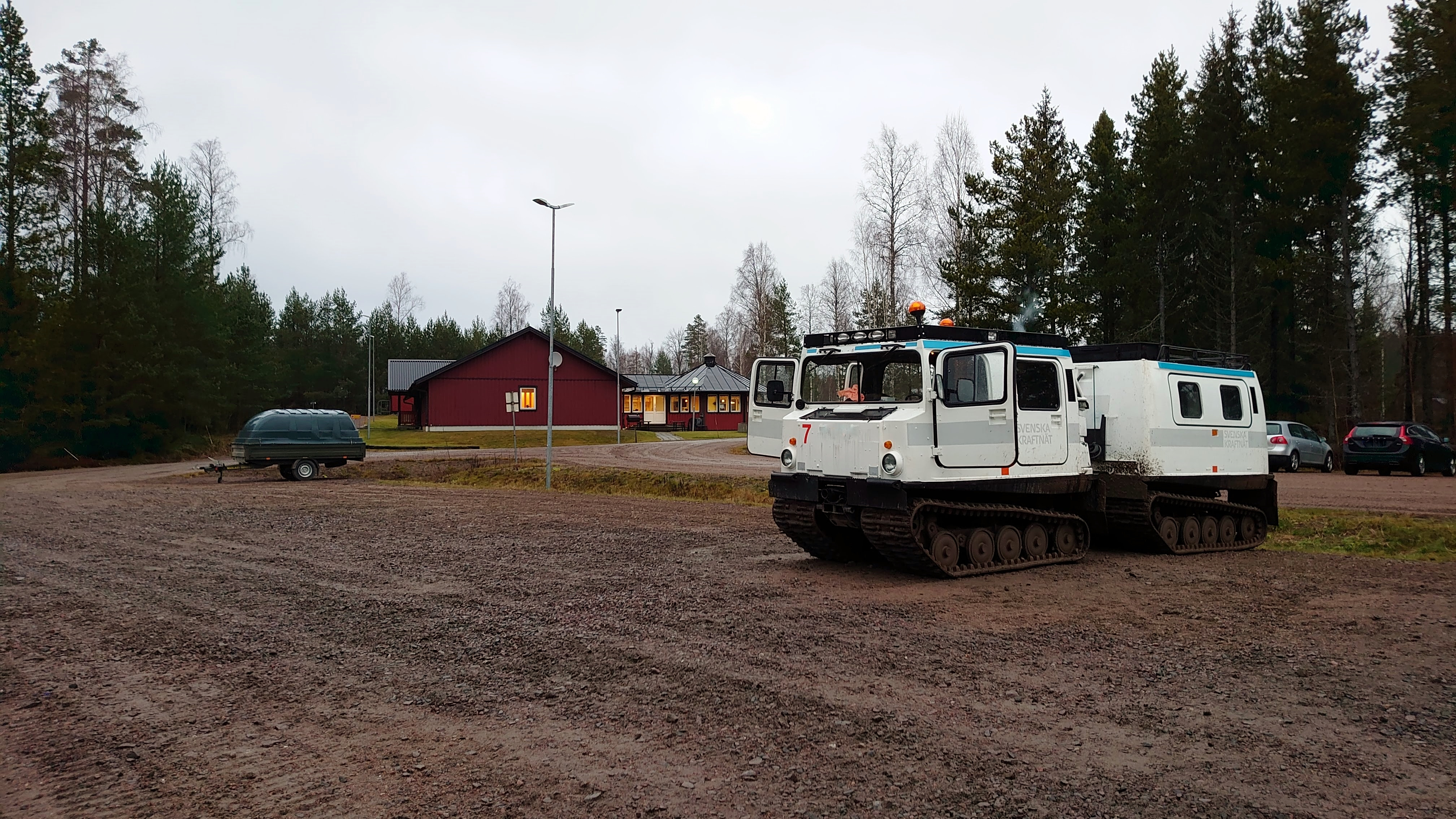
Bandvagn in civil service with energy company Svenska kraftnät

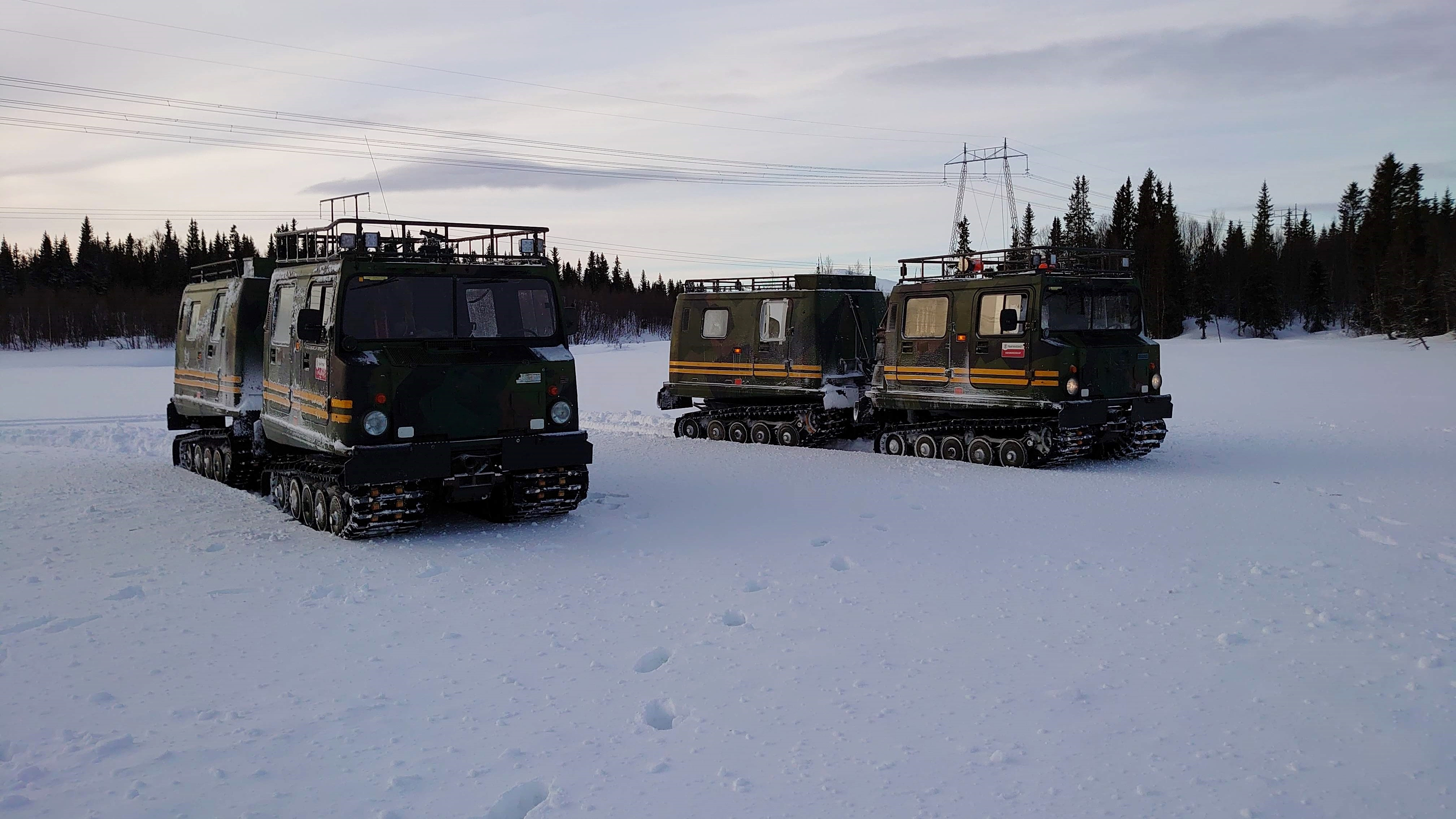
Bandvagn in civil service with the Swedish Transport Administration

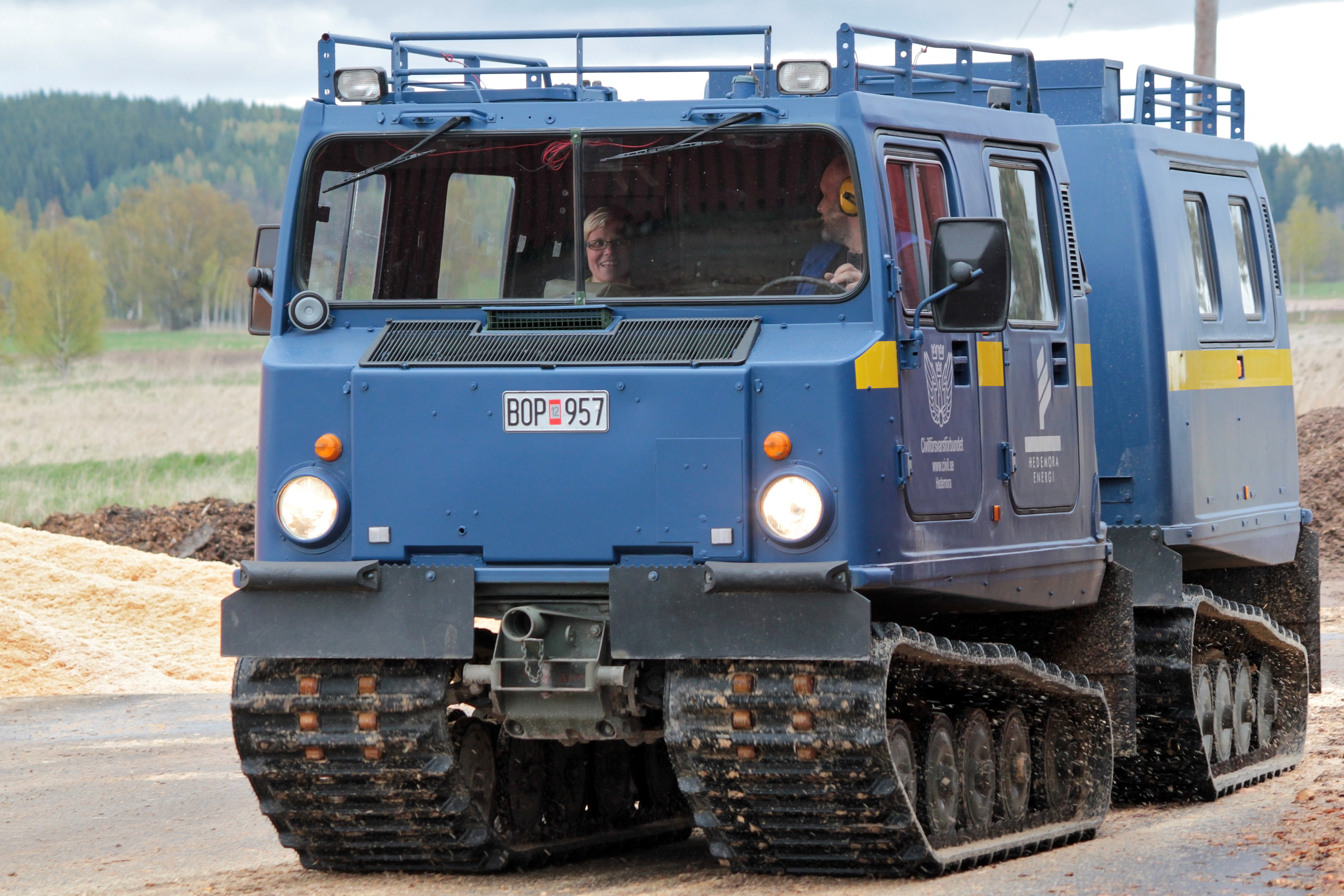
Bandvagn in civil service with energy company Hedemora Energi

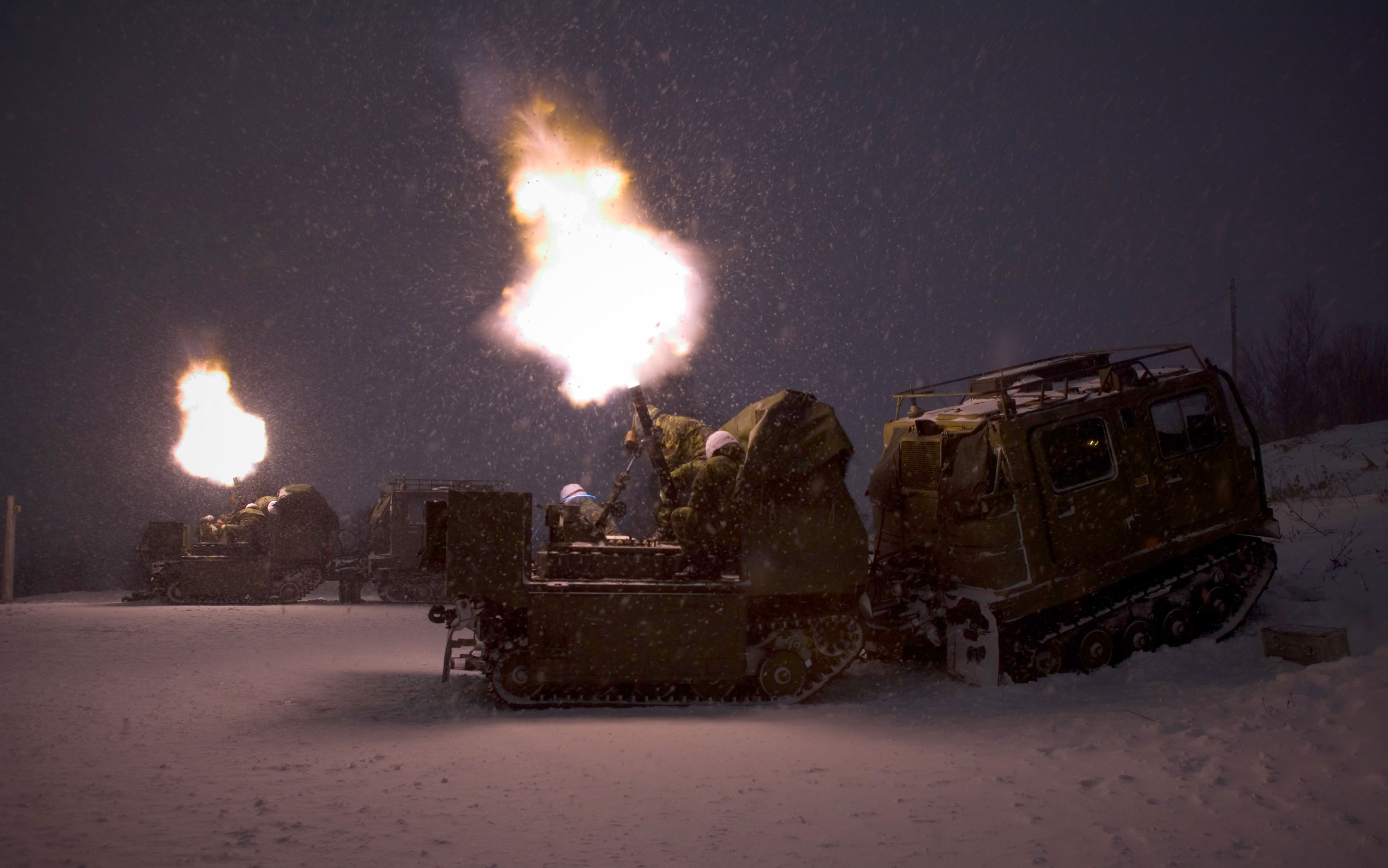
Bandvagn in mortar configuration with the Norwegian Army

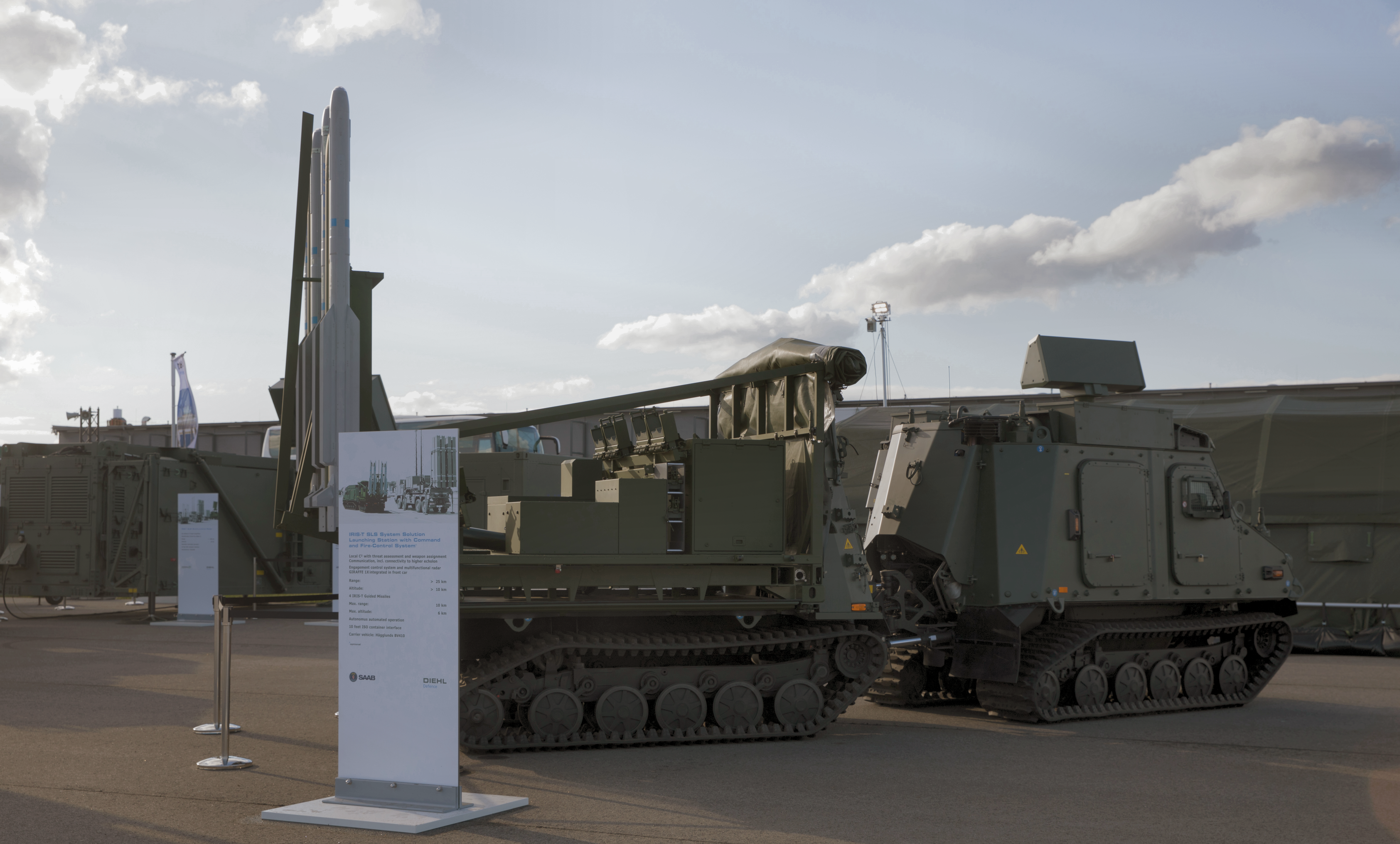
Bandvagn in air-defence configuration with IRIS-T

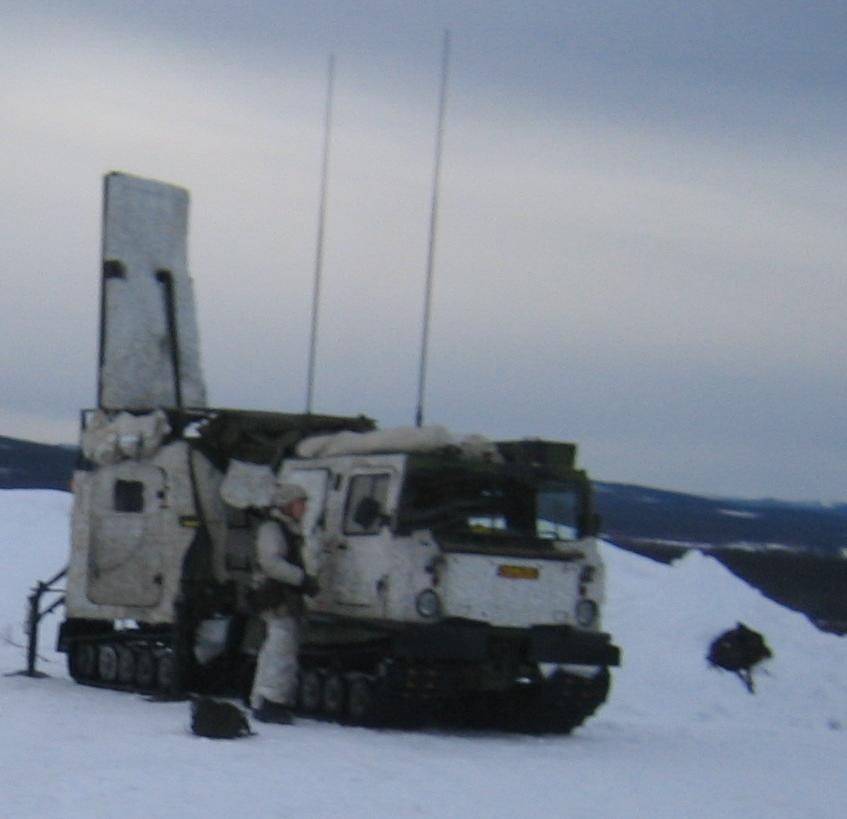
Bandvagn in artillery hunting radar configuration with ARTHUR

=== Current operators ===
- (Argentina) Argentine National Gendarmerie
- (Austria) Austrian Armed Forces
- (Brazil) Brazilian Marine Corps
- (United Kingdom) British Armed Forces
- (Canada) Canadian Army, due to be replaced under the Domestic Arctic Mobility Enhancement (DAME) project.
- (Chile) Chilean Marine Corps
- (Estonia) Estonian Defence Forces
- (Finland) Finnish Army
- (France) French Army
- (Germany) German Army
- (Greece) Hellenic Army – Used with ARTHUR counterbattery radar.
- (Indonesia) Indonesian Army — Used by 2nd Group of the Kopassus special forces.
- Israel Defense Forces
- (Italy) Italian Army (about 110 BV-206; 112 BV-206S7 and 46 BV-206S)
- (Latvia) Latvian Land Forces
- (Lithuania) Lithuanian Land Force
- (Malaysia) Malaysian Army - (80)
- Netherlands Navy
- (Norway) Norwegian Army – (1000)
- Singapore Army
- (South Korea) South Korean Army
- (Spain) Spanish Army
- (Sweden) Swedish Army – (4,500) Includes BvS 10 variant
- (Thailand) Royal Thai Army
- (Ukraine) Ukrainian Ground Forces
- United States Armed Forces – Used in the United States Army by the 86th Infantry Brigade Combat Team, the 1st Infantry Brigade Combat Team and 2nd Infantry Brigade Combat Team (Airborne), 11th Airborne Division. Also used by the United States Marine Corps.
- United States National Guard

==== Civilian operators ====
- Ministry of Emergency Situations of Armenia
- (Australia) New South Wales Ambulance
- (Canada) Low Impact Inc.
- (Canada) Soulang Auto Inc.
- (Canada) Red Deer County Technical Rescue Task Force
- (Canada) Four Tracks All-Terrain Edmonton Alberta
- (Canada) Green-Zone Environmental
- (Denmark) LEGOLAND Billund
- (Estonia) Estonian Rescue Board
- (Greece) Hellenic Fire Service
- (Iceland) Icelandic Association for Search and Rescue
- (Indonesia) Mobile Brigade Corps of Indonesian National Police
- (Indonesia) Indonesian Red Cross
- (Italy) Italian National Firefighters Corps
- New Zealand Antarctic Research Programme
- Several hundred ex-Norwegian sold and believed to have ended up in Russia.
- (United Kingdom) Royal National Lifeboat Institution
- (United Kingdom) Bay Search and Rescue Team
- (United Kingdom) Greater Manchester Fire and Rescue Service
- (United States) Massachusetts State Police
- (United States) Schlumberger
- (United States) South Metro Fire Rescue in Centennial, CO in the south region of the Denver metropolitan area at Station 46.
- (Norway) University Centre in Svalbard
- Fire Rescue Service of the Czech Republic.

=== Former operators ===
- (Republic of Ireland) Irish Defence Forces 7 Bandvagn 206 fitted with GIRAFFE Mk IV radars used by Irish Defence Force. Also 2 Bandvagn 206 used by Civil Defence Ireland. All Bandvagn 206s, military and civilian, retired by 2026.

== See also ==
Similar vehicles with the bv 206 ATV include:

- Sisu Auto Sisu Nasu
- ST Kinetics Bronco All Terrain Tracked Carrier
- BAE Systems Hägglunds BvS 10
- Bolinder-Munktell (Volvo BM) Bandvagn 202
- World War II Germany's Raupenschlepper Ost
