= Bronco All Terrain Tracked Carrier =

Type of amphibious off-road vehicle

Bronco All Terrain Tracked Carrier (ATTC)
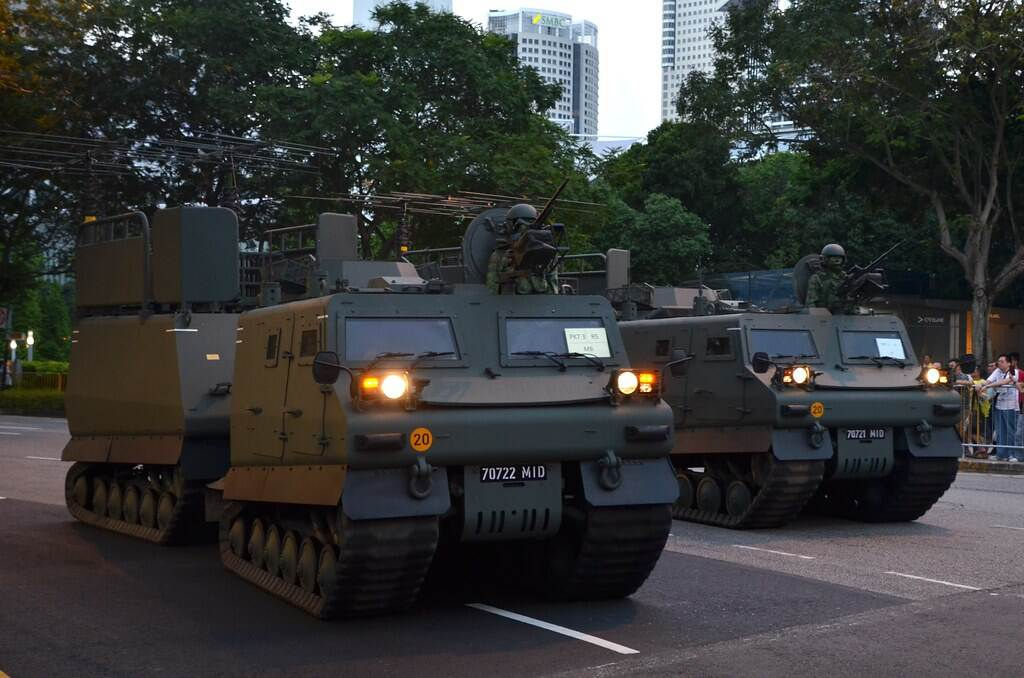
- Bronco ATTC of the Singapore Army
- Type: Amphibious armoured vehicle
- Place of origin: Singapore

Service history
- Used by: See operators

Production history
- Designer: ST Kinetics; Defence Science and Technology Agency (DSTA)
- Manufacturer: ST Engineering (formerly ST Kinetics); Otokar; Sisu Auto (Lisensed production); Roshel (ExtremV)

Specifications
- Mass: 10.2 tonnes (22,500 lb) (curb)
- Length: 8.6 metres (28 ft 3 in)
- Width: 2.2 metres (7 ft 2.6 in)
- Height: 2.3 metres (7 ft 6.6 in)
- Crew: 1
- Passengers: 15 (5 front + 10 rear)
- Armor: Steel, AMAP-ADS active protection system
- Main armament: FN MAG 7.62 mm General Purpose Machine Gun (ATTC); or Ultimax 100 5.56 mm Light Machine Gun
- Secondary armament: Smoke grenade launchers
- Engine: Caterpillar 3126B, 350 bhp (261 kW) at 2400 rpm MTU 6R106 TD21, 326 PS (240 kW) at 2200 rpm
- Maximum speed: Paved road: 60 km/h (37.3 mph); Cross country: 25 km/h (15.5 mph); Swimming: 4.5 km/h (2.80 mph)

The Bronco All Terrain Tracked Carrier (ATTC) is a twin chassis multi-purpose tracked articulated vehicle jointly developed for the Singapore Army by ST Kinetics (current ST Engineering) and the Defence Science and Technology Agency (DSTA).

A variant of the Bronco was formerly under British service in Afghanistan as the Warthog. The civilian variant of the Bronco was marketed as the ExtremV.

== Design ==
The Bronco consists of two fully armoured front and rear units connected by a hydraulic articulated joint. The all-welded steel armoured hull provides the occupants with protection from 7.62 mm small arms fire and shell splinters.

The Bronco is powered by a Caterpillar model 3126B four-stroke turbocharged and charge air-cooled diesel engine developing 350 bhp at 2,400 rpm coupled to an Allison MD3560P fully automatic transmission. Designed to traverse difficult terrain, the Bronco has a ground pressure of 60 kPa and is fitted with heavy-duty seamless rubber tracks and a running gear system for soft ground conditions and directional stability. Swimming operations require minimal preparation and it can achieve a swimming speed of 4 km/h. The Bronco's four-sprocket drive, fully articulated steering with optional differential lock provides for small turning radius manoeuvres and improved performance.

The Bronco has a load carrying capacity of up to 5 tonnes and is capable of a top speed of 60 km/h (37 mph) on the road and at least 25 km/h (16 mph) on cross-country terrain. An advantage the standard Bronco has over other western armoured personnel carriers is its relatively large interior, with seating for 16 including the driver, dependent on percentile measurements. The troop carrier version can carry six people in the front unit and ten in the rear unit. Maximum payload is 1,200 kg (2,600 lb) for the front unit and 3,000 kg (6,600 lb) for the rear unit. The cargo carrier, which is fitted with drop sides and a drop tailgate, can carry 3,700 kg (8,200 lb) in the rear unit while retaining the amphibious characteristics of the troop-carrying version. The Bronco is fully air-portable in a C-130 Hercules transport aircraft.

== Variants ==
Singapore has already deployed several variants of the Bronco, including ambulance, engineer, repair and recovery, load carrier, troop carrier and fuel resupply vehicles. Troop carrier, ambulance, command and repair and recovery variants of the Warthog were also built under contract. The Warthog uses a different engine, a Caterpillar C7 turbocharged 6-cylinder diesel delivering 350 hp (260 kW). Once delivered to the UK, contractor Thales fitted the vehicles according to MoD specifications with Bowman communications systems, specialist electronic counter-measure equipment and extra protective armour including bar armour and protected seats for occupants at their facility in the former MoD depot at Llangennech near Llanelli, South Wales.

ST Engineering had formerly manufactured the firefighter and other civilian variants of the ATTC under its U.S. subsidiary, Hackney, before its liquidation in 2023, as well as its former China subsidiary, GJK, before its divestment in the second-quarter of 2016.

=== Mortar Tracked Carrier ===
A variant of the Bronco All-Terrain Tracked Carrier, the Mortar Tracked Carrier (MTC) is jointly developed by the SAF, DSTA and Singapore Technologies Kinetics. Operating on a 4 men crew, the MTC's primary weapon is the ST Kinetics 120mm Super Rapid Advanced Mortar System (SRAMS), the world's first recoiled mortar to incorporate a blast diffuser, greatly reducing the blast overpressure effect generated by mortars, thus allowing longer periods of firing without injuring the crew. The MTC has a built-in Automatic Fire Control System (AFCS) comprising a Fire Control Unit and an inertial navigation system, allowing it to conduct immediate deployment without conventional surveying methods. A hydro-pneumatic Recoil System reduces the overall recoil force, thus allowing minimal reinforcement of the original hull structure, and post-firing stabilising time. This increases the rate of firing with improved accuracy. The AFCS is also equipped with a Mortar Platoon Management System (MPMS), which enables it to be networked via the Battlefield Management System (BMS).

=== Bronco 3 ===
At the DSEI 2017 exhibit, ST Kinetics unveiled the development of the Bronco 3. The Bronco 3 is the logical evolution of the Bronco 2 (Warthog), and factors in many lessons gained from more than 15 years of service of the Bronco 1 with Singapore as well as operational experience of the Warthog in Afghanistan. Development of the Bronco 3 commenced in 2010, with a key design aim to provide at least Warthog levels of protection at no more than Bronco 1's base design gross vehicle weight of 16 tonnes, instead of the Warthog's ultimate operational weight which peaked at 21 tonnes. An amphibious capability comparable to that of the original Bronco 1 was also desired, with the Bronco 3 capable of attaining 5 km/h in water. Both modules have been redesigned and now feature blast deflecting V-shaped hulls suspended from a redesigned and stiffened chassis by four rubber isolators; additional benefits of this isolator interface include the ability to swap the rear module in less than 30 minutes, and a reduction (when compared to Bronco 2) in noise, vibration, and harshness levels of 50%. To further increase mine/IED protection in the rear wagon, this has now a one-metre ground clearance, the roof having been heightened to ensure a greater volume of 7.9 m^{3} for the rear and 5.2 m^{3} for the front module. The Bronco 3 is fitted with a new Mercedes-MTU TD106 325 hp engine providing higher torque, delivering improved off-road performance and reduced fuel consumption.

=== Sisu GTT ===
Licensed variant of the Bronco, with subsequent development and integration of local equipment in Finland.

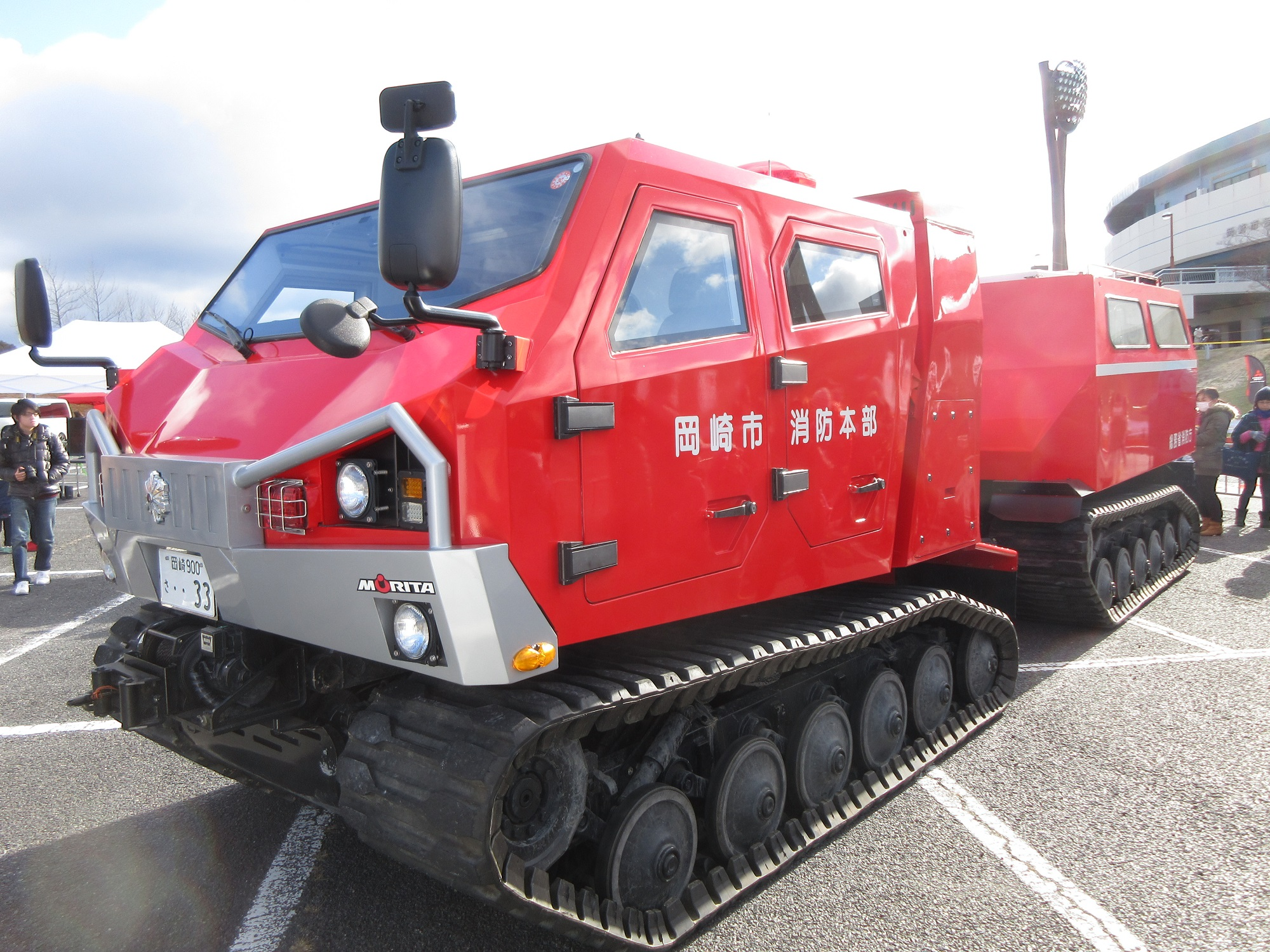
Red Salamander, an ExtremV vehicle variant, operated by the Okazaki City Fire Department in Japan

=== ExtremV ===
The ExtremV is a civilian variant of the Bronco designed for emergency response, humanitarian aid, and disaster relief tasks. The vehicle is designed to withstand extreme weather and complex terrain conditions including floodwaters, soft ground, and rugged landscapes. The Arctic variant, which is to be produced under licence by Roshel in Canada from 2025, is a candidate for the Canadian Domestic Arctic Mobility Enhancement (DAME) program.

The ExtremV vehicle has been used in disaster response operations in several countries. It was deployed during the 2016 floods and landslides in Japan’s Kyushu region, Tropical Storm Mawar in the Philippines in 2023, and after Hurricane Otis in Mexico later that year, primarily to support evacuations and the transport of relief supplies in areas inaccessible to conventional vehicles.

In 2024, the vehicle was used in southern Thailand to deliver supplies and evacuate residents from flooded and soft-terrain areas.

== Deployment ==
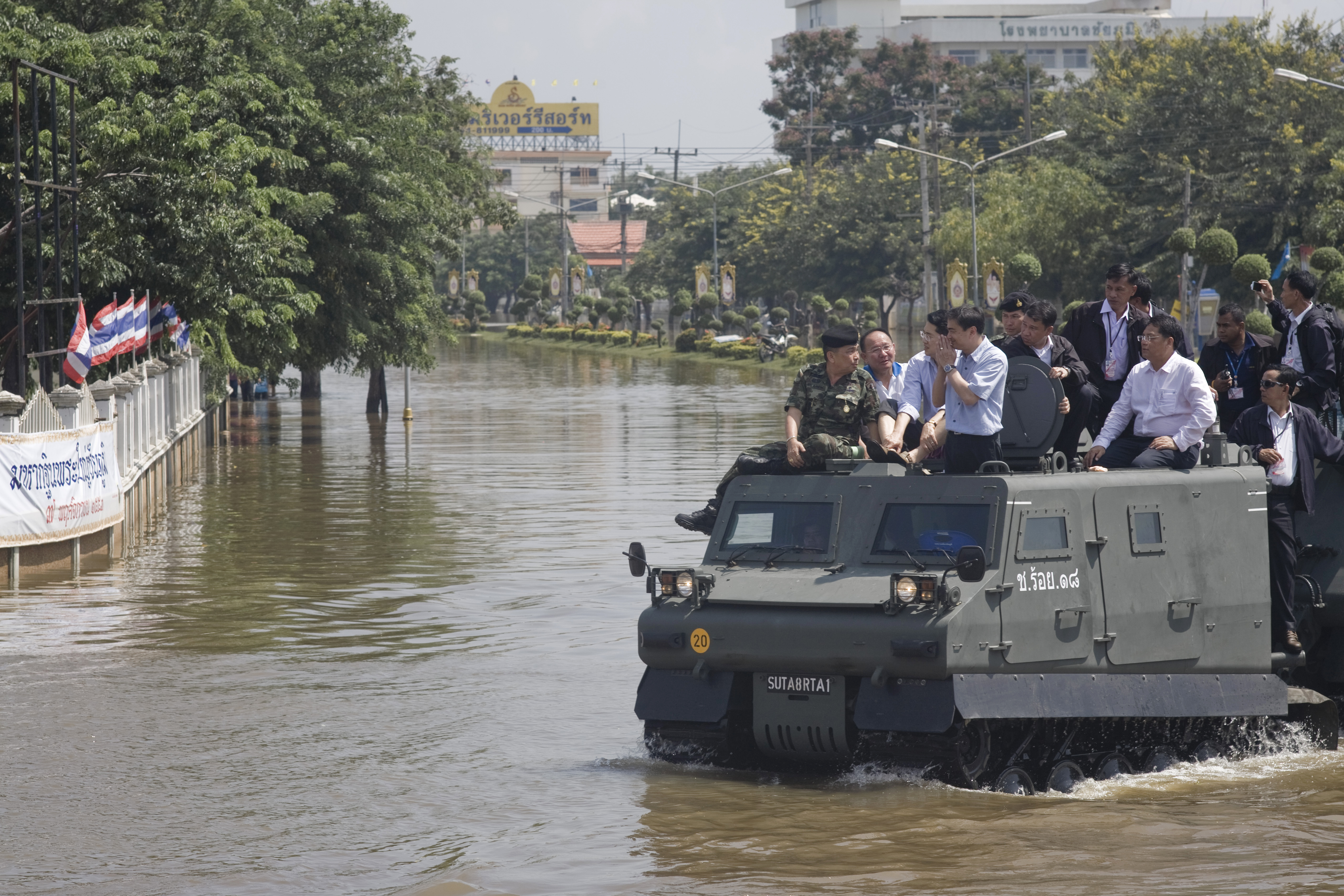
Thailand's Prime Minister Abhisit Vejjajiva atop a Royal Thai Army Bronco troop carrier during the 2010 Thai floods.

The Bronco has been in service with the Singapore Armed Forces since 2001, with more than 600 delivered. In 2007, Thailand became the first export customer for the Bronco. The Bronco has undergone extensive trials in a number of countries, including Finland, France, Morocco, Turkey and the US. Overall, more than 1,200 vehicles have been delivered in at least 20 different versions.

=== British service ===
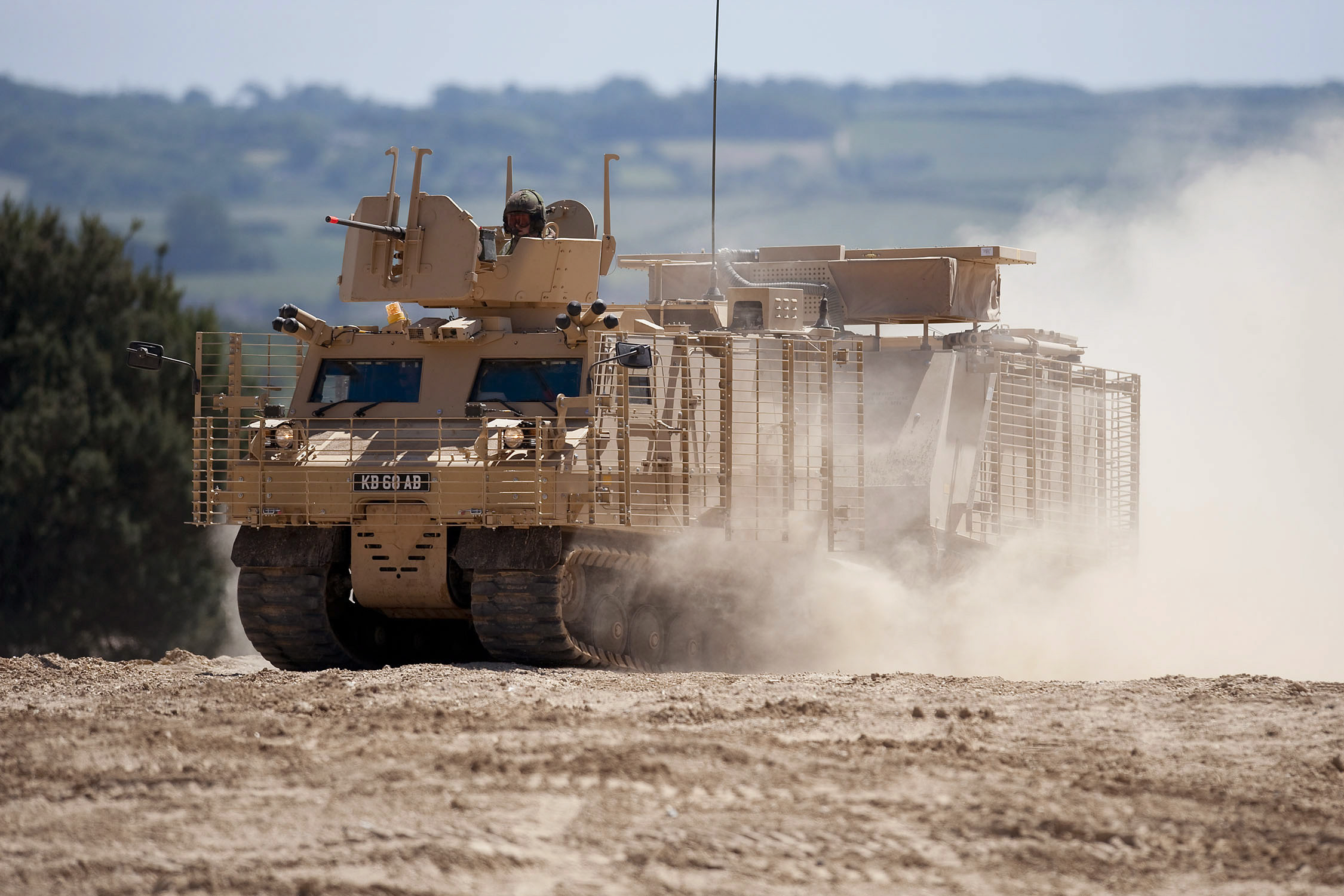
A British Warthog with 50 BMG M2 Browning turret on trial at Bovington Camp.

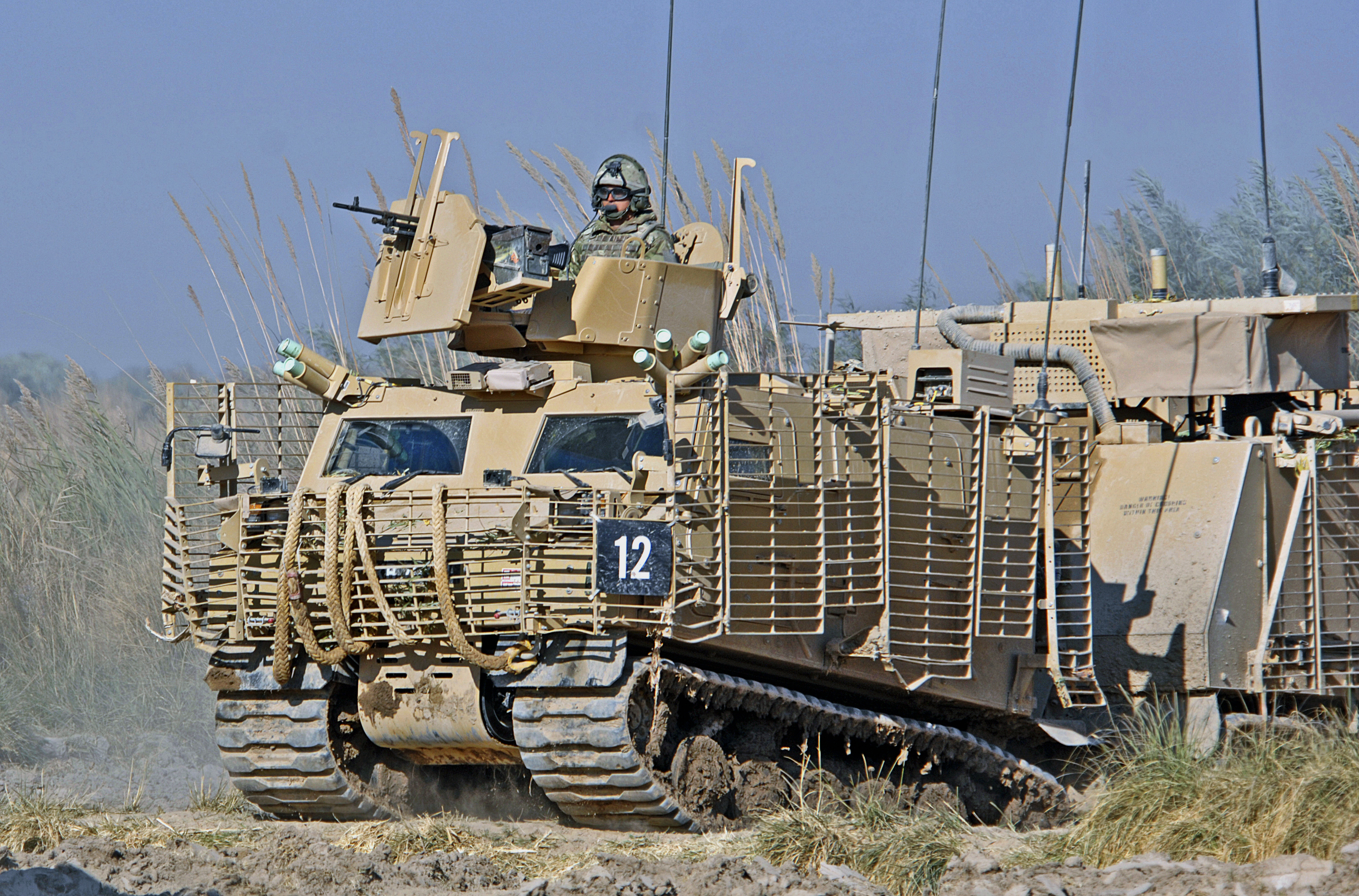
A Warthog on patrol in the Loy Mandah district in Afghanistan's Helmand province.

In December 2008, ST Kinetics was awarded a £150 million single source contract by the British Ministry of Defence for over 100 Bronco All Terrain Tracked Carriers for use in Afghanistan under an Urgent Operational Requirement (UOR). The vehicles, known as Warthog in British service, supplemented the similar BvS 10 Viking vehicles operating in southern Afghanistan by the British military, and was procured as part of a £700 million package announced by Defence Secretary John Hutton. Deliveries began in the third quarter of 2009 and finished in 2010. The first vehicles arrived in Afghanistan in mid-2010.

Throughout its use in Afghanistan, the UK's fleet of 115 Warthogs survived around 30 direct improvised explosive device (IED) strikes with no crew fatalities, the relatively low strike rate part-attributable to the design's ability to traverse terrain inaccessible to other wheeled or tracked vehicles. In December 2010, a British Army soldier, Lance Corporal William Reeks, survived an IED attack after the Warthog he was travelling in set off an IED believed to be 50 kg (110 lb). His family believes that the stronger armour of the Warthogs, which replaced less heavily fortified Viking armoured vehicles prior to their protection upgrades, helped save their son's life.

The Warthog continued in British service in Helmand Province until the closure of Camp Bastion in 2015. While operating as part of the Royal Marines Armoured Support Group, it was crewed throughout its use in Afghanistan by soldiers exclusively from the Royal Armoured Corps. The last Warthog Group came from C (the Duke of Edinburgh) Squadron, the Queen's Royal Hussars.

While Janes had reported that British Warthogs were planned to have been transformed to serve as transporter vehicles for the Thales Watchkeeper UAV manned by 32nd Regiment Royal Artillery and 47th Regiment Royal Artillery under the Army 2020 concept, a subsequent March 2016 report stated that the British Army had phased out the Warthog in October 2015, as it was specifically for use in Afghanistan operations.

The Ukrainian armed forces has received a total of 25 Warthogs in three versions from the German federal government, including five repair and recovery vehicles, ten ambulance and ten command vehicles.

== Operators ==
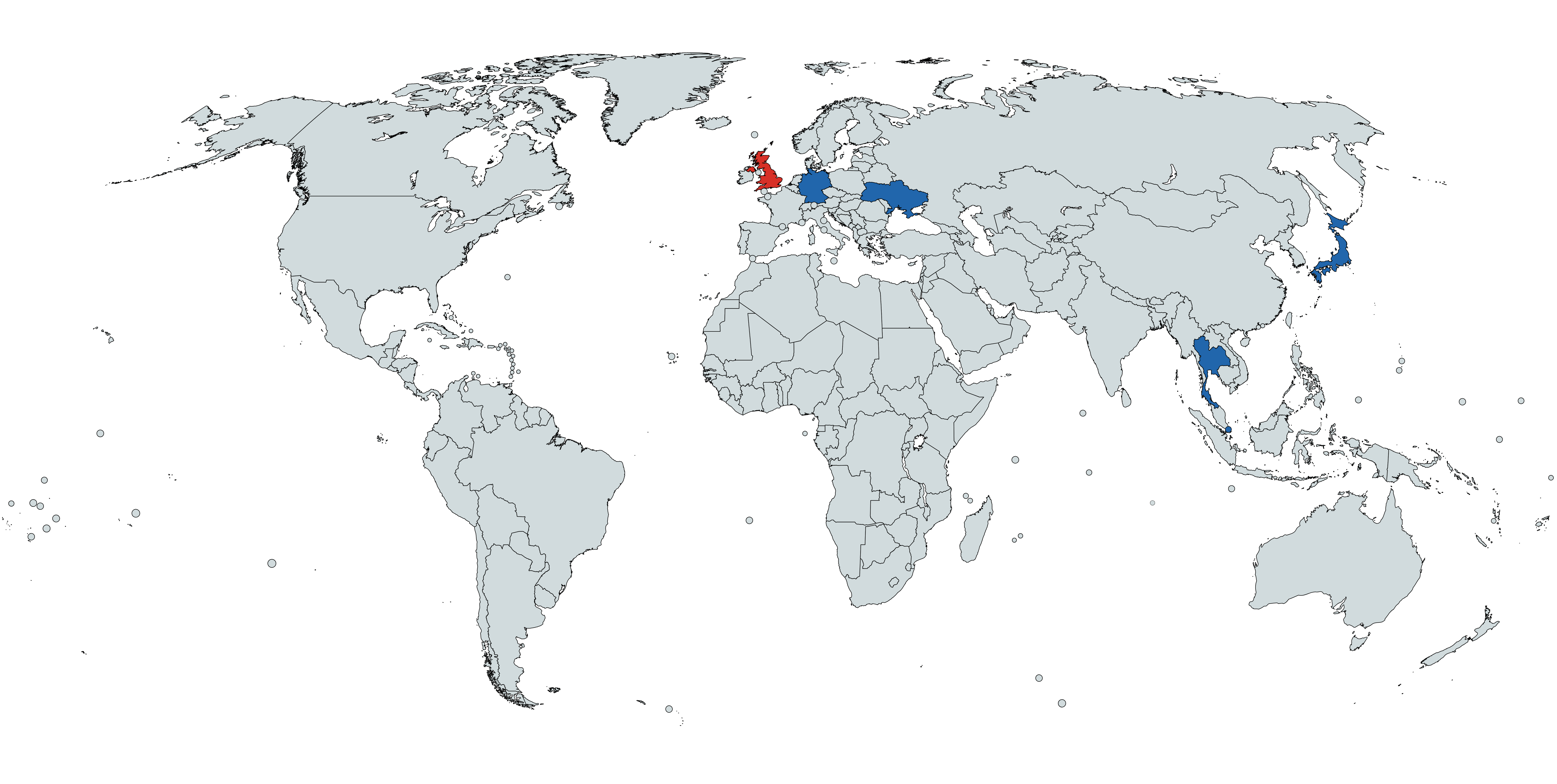
Operators: Current Former

=== Military operators ===
==== Current operators ====
Germany

- Bundeswehr – 2 ExtremV deployed in WTD-91

Singapore

- Singapore Army – 400

Thailand

- Royal Thai Army – at least 11 (including at least 1 ExtremV)

Ukraine

- Ukrainian Armed Forces – 25 supplied by Germany (as of July 2024)

==== Potential operators ====
Finland

- Sisu developed the SISU GTT based on the Bronco, and could be ordered by the Finnish Army.

Canada

- Potential vehicle for the Canadian Domestic Arctic Mobility Enhancement (DAME) program, to be confirmed in 2026.

==== Former operators ====
United Kingdom

- British Army

=== Civilian operators ===
==== Current operators ====
Japan

- Okazaki City Fire Department - 1 (Red Salamander)

== See also ==
- BvS10 – the vehicle supplemented by the Bronco in British Army service
- Sisu Nasu - Finnish tracked ATV
- Bandvagn 206 - Swedish tracked ATV currently in service
- Vityaz (ATV) - large, Soviet tracked ATV
