= BvS10 =

Swedish all-terrain carrier

Bandvagn Skyddad 10
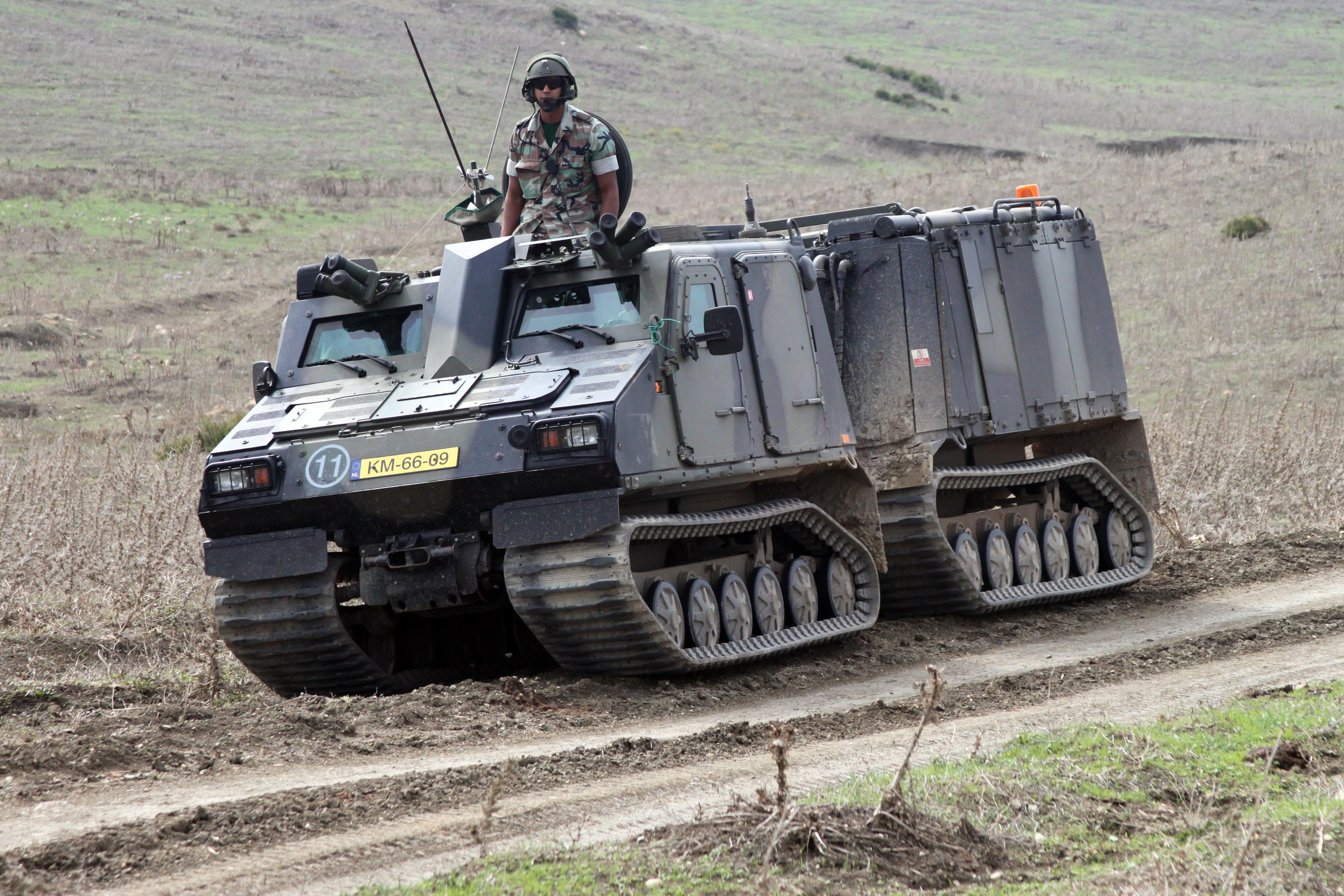
- BvS10 of the Netherlands Marine Corps.
- Type: Amphibious armoured vehicle
- Place of origin: Sweden / United Kingdom

Service history
- Used by: See users

Production history
- Designer: BAE Systems Land Systems Hägglunds

Specifications
- Mass: 5.0 t (4.9 long tons; 5.5 short tons) (front car); 3.5 tonnes (rear car, APC version)
- Length: 8.0 m (26 ft 3 in)
- Width: 2.25 m (7 ft 5 in)
- Height: 2.45 m (8 ft 0 in) (front car); 2.1 m (rear car)
- Crew: driver
- Passengers: 4 passengers (front car), 8 passengers (rear car)
- Armour: Basic hull protection against Small-arms fire and artillery threat (STANAG 4569 level 2) Enhanced protection (option) With add-on up to 14.5 mm. (STANAG 4569 level 4) Liner (optional) Basic protection against smaller AP mines, Enhanced protection (option) with Additional deflector plates.
- Main armament: Variant dependent (mortar carrier, troop transport with RCWS equipped with machine guns (5.56mm to 12.7mm) or automatic grenade launchers (40mm))
- Secondary armament: Smoke grenade launchers (front)
- Engine: Cummins 6.7 litre in-line six-cylinder turbocharged diesel 285 hp (213 kW); 970 N⋅m (720 ft⋅lb)
- Transmission: Allison automatic (6 speed forward/1 reverse)
- Operational range: up to 500km
- Maximum speed: 70 km/h (43 mph) roads 5 km/h (3.1 mph) water

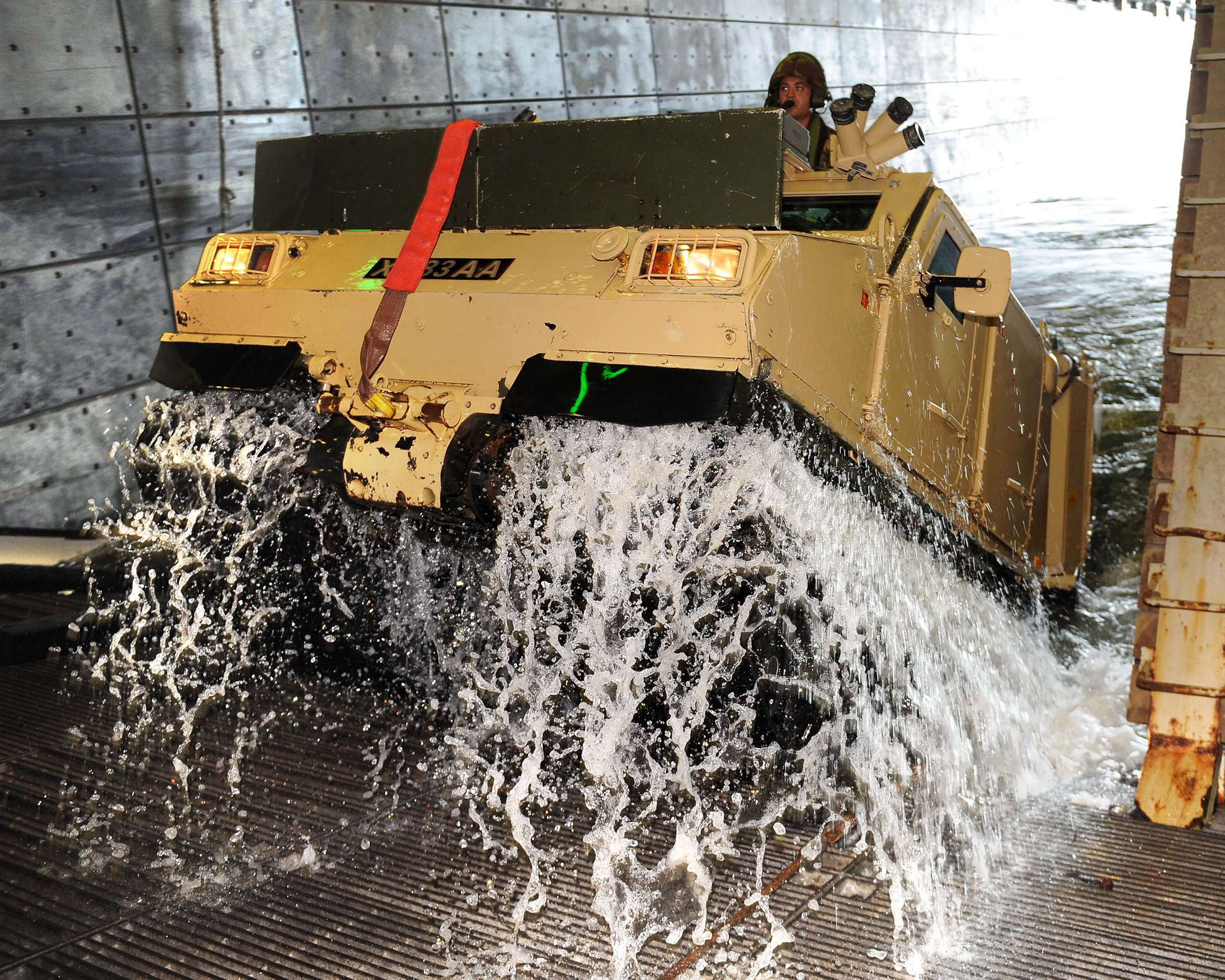
British Viking in the well dock of HMS Bulwark

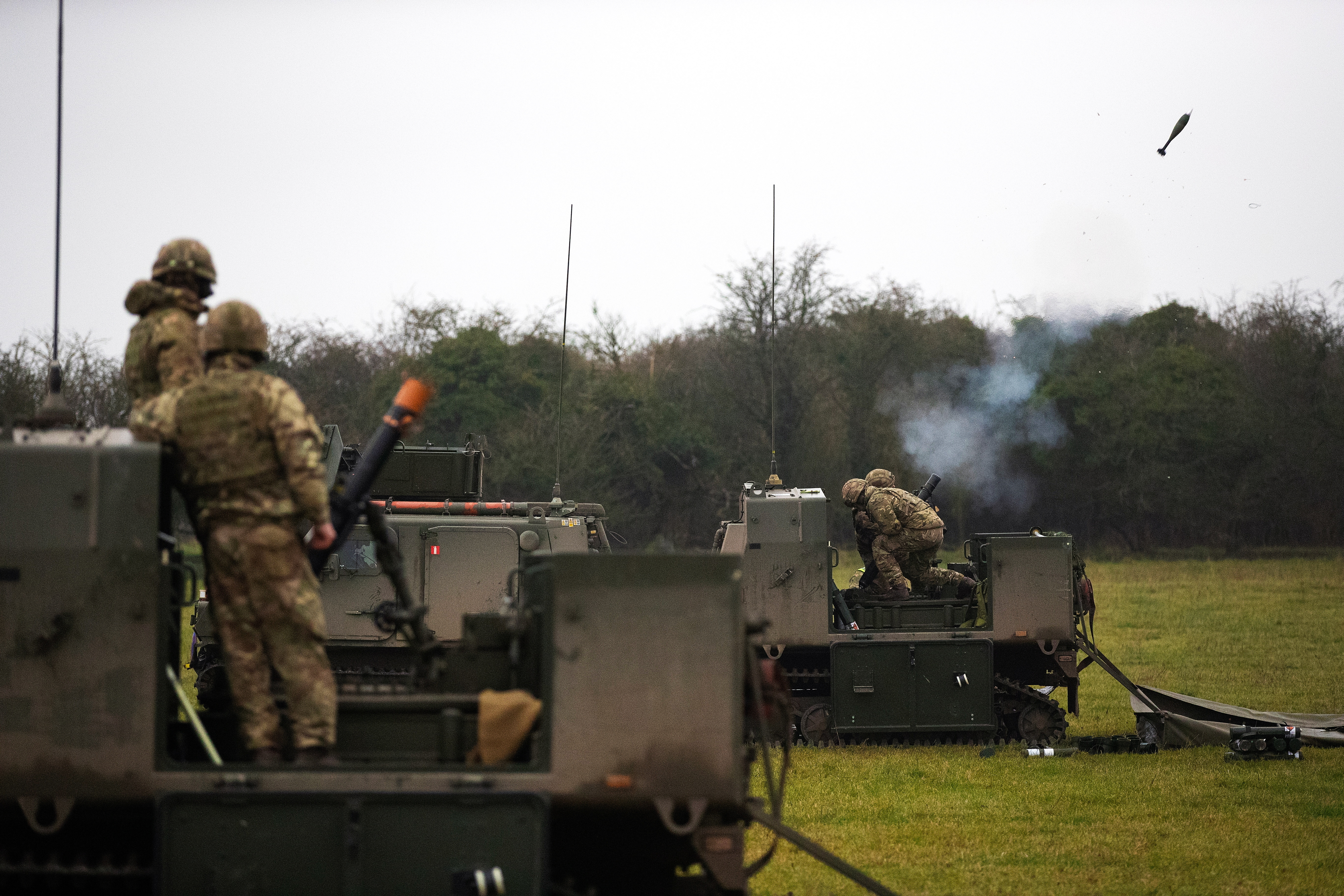
Viking Mortar Section of RM Armoured Support Group in 2020

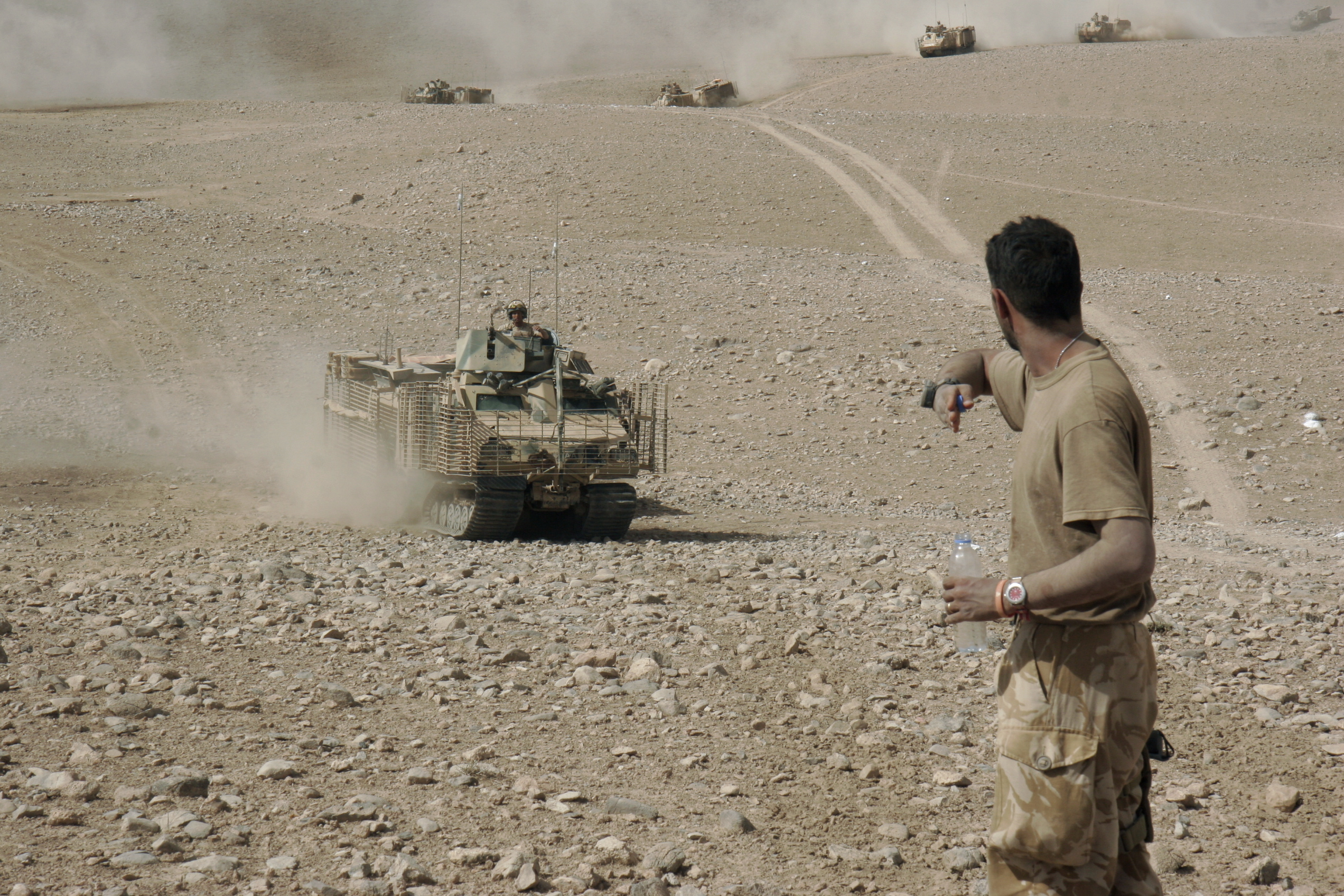
Queen's Royal Lancers in Helmand, 2008.

The BvS10 (Bandvagn Skyddad 10, also known as Bandvagn 410 or BV410) is a tracked articulated amphibious all-terrain armoured vehicle produced by BAE Systems Land Systems Hägglunds of Sweden and by FNSS of Turkey (under license). This vehicle, referred to as the All Terrain Vehicle (protected) - ATV(P) or Viking by the UK forces, was originally developed as a collaboration between industry - Hägglunds Vehicle AB - and the British Ministry of Defence (MoD) on behalf of the Royal Marines.

The BvS10 is similar to, but distinct from, Hägglunds earlier Bandvagn 206 or Bv 206S. It is a much larger vehicle based upon the characteristic twin-cab, articulated frame-steering system typical of Hägglunds all-terrain vehicles. The main differences from the older Bv206s are a more powerful Cummins 5.9 litre diesel engine, improved ground clearance, and newly developed chassis, power train and steering units that give the vehicle considerably enhanced speed (up to 65 km/h from the previous 51.5 km/h on road) and comfort on road and in terrain, as well as greater load-carrying capability (up to 5 tons), and the ability to add various modular sub-systems such as add-on armour, weapon mounts, a load-changer and cargo platforms.

== Operational history ==
=== Royal Marines ===
Originally designed for the British Royal Marines and named Viking, the vehicle underwent extensive trials and development programme from 2001 to 2004, led by Major Jez Hermer, before the Royal Marines accepted 108 vehicles into service, with delivery commencing in 2005. The Royal Marines Armoured Support Company took the vehicle on operations for the first time in Afghanistan in September 2006, prior to the Royal Marines Armoured Support Group being formed in December 2007.

==== UK variants ====
The UK currently operates four variants of the vehicle : The Troop Carrying Variant (TCV) capable of carrying 2 crew plus 10 passengers; the Command Variant (CV), which carries 2 crew plus up to 8 passengers with the rear cab being designed as an enhanced digital communications platform, the Repair and Recovery Variant (RRV), carrying 4 specialist maintenance vehicle mechanic crewmen and the Ambulance Variant (AV). The rear cab of the RRV carries a HIAB crane, a fully mobile workshop, an air compressor and a 9 tonne capacity capstan winch, together with hydraulic anchors. All four variants are fully air-portable under a Boeing CH-47 Chinook helicopter, either complete or in two separate front and rear component parts and are also fully amphibious; being capable of swimming in varying sea-states with a full load of passengers and stores.

UK Viking vehicle variants are used as amphibious armoured all-terrain vehicles for troop transport and as vehicle repair recovery vehicles.

==== UK deployments ====
Some 33 British Vikings, fitted with slat armour, were deployed to Afghanistan at the end of summer 2006 when the Royal Marines relieved the Parachute Regiment in Helmand province. Their low ground pressure is not enough to trigger most of the anti-tank mines in use in Afghanistan, but they have proved vulnerable to improvised explosive devices (IEDs). Viking was subsequently upgraded with higher levels of Armour protection. Vikings were replaced with the ST Engineering Land Systems (STK) BRONCO known as Warthog within the UK military.

==== UK follow-on orders ====
In May 2007 the Ministry of Defence placed an order with BAE Systems Hägglunds for a further 21 units, some of which were intended to be used as a equipment transporter for the in development Thales Watchkeeper unmanned aerial vehicle ground equipment, however due to delays with that program, this never came to be.

Additionally on 26 June 2008 the MoD announced the purchase of an additional 14 Viking BvS10 vehicles at a cost of £14 million, including nine repair recovery vehicles, one command vehicle and four troop carriers, for deployment to Afghanistan. In January 2009, nine more vehicles were ordered.

Ninety-nine Vikings were revamped in a £37 million project, further improving their firepower, armour and protection. This upgrade was due be completed in 2014 The upgrade was completed in April 2016.

=== Netherlands Marine Corps ===
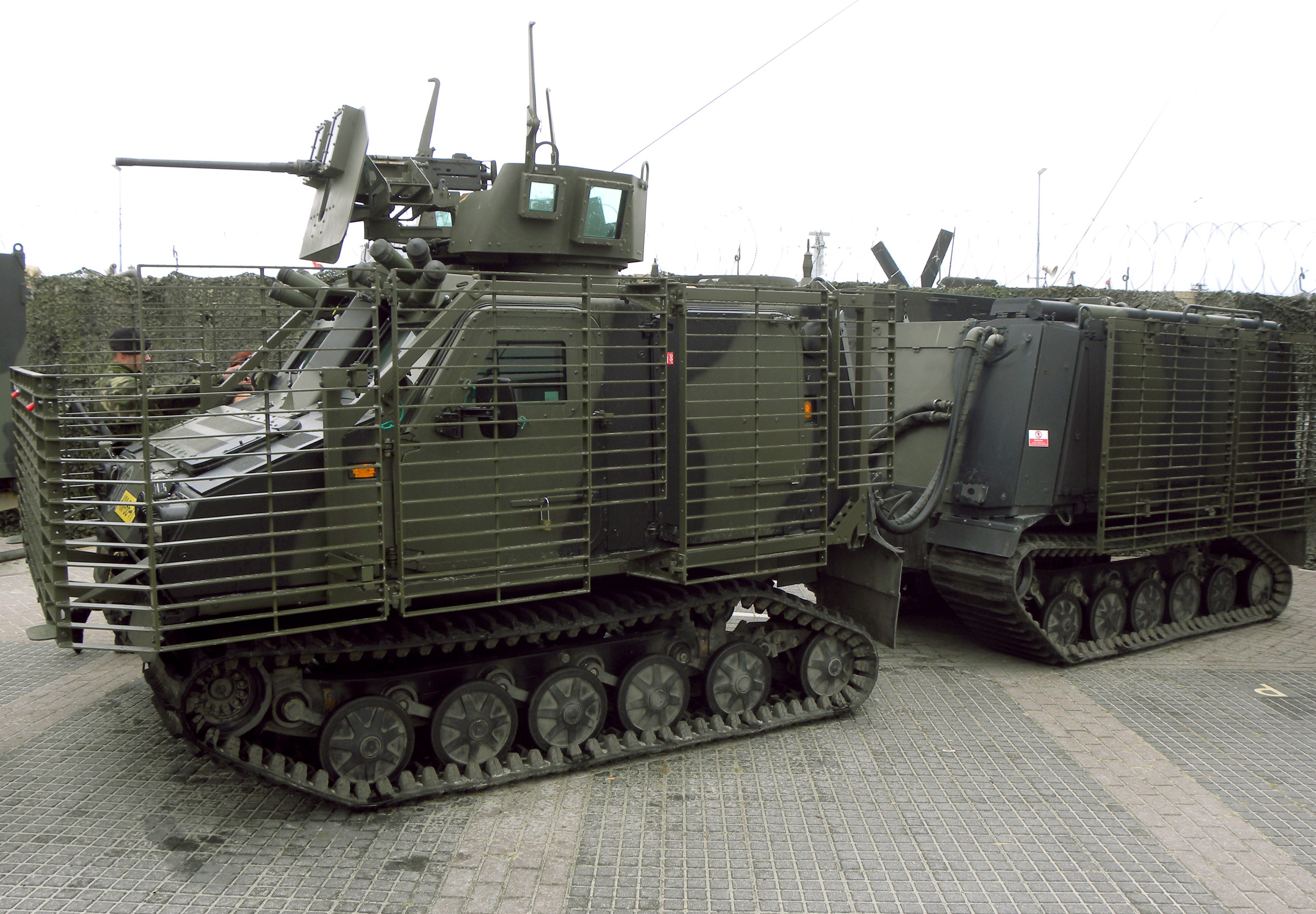
VIKING Armoured Vehicle of the Netherlands Marine Corps during a demonstration.

The BvS10 is also in use with the Netherlands Marine Corps. 74 units have been delivered (46 APC, 20 command vehicles, 4 repair and recovery vehicles and 4 ambulance vehicles).

==== Dutch deployments ====
On 27 March 2008 the Dutch Parliament decided in favour of sending a 60-men strong Marine reconnaissance unit to Chad in support of the EUFOR peacekeeping mission in the region. The marines functioned as the eyes and ears of an Irish battalion. This was the first operational deployment of the BvS10 Viking in Dutch service after exercises in Norway and the UK.

As part of the Dutch ISAF contribution, a Royal Netherlands Marine Corps company was deployed to the province of Uruzgan in Afghanistan since July 2009. Several BvS10 Vikings were modified with slat armour for this mission.

== Variants ==
=== Beowulf ===
Unarmoured version of the BvS10, with a new cabin. It carries up to 14 people or 8 tons of cargo with a top speed of 65 km/h, and like the Viking is fully amphibious without special preparations.

== Sales ==
=== French order ===
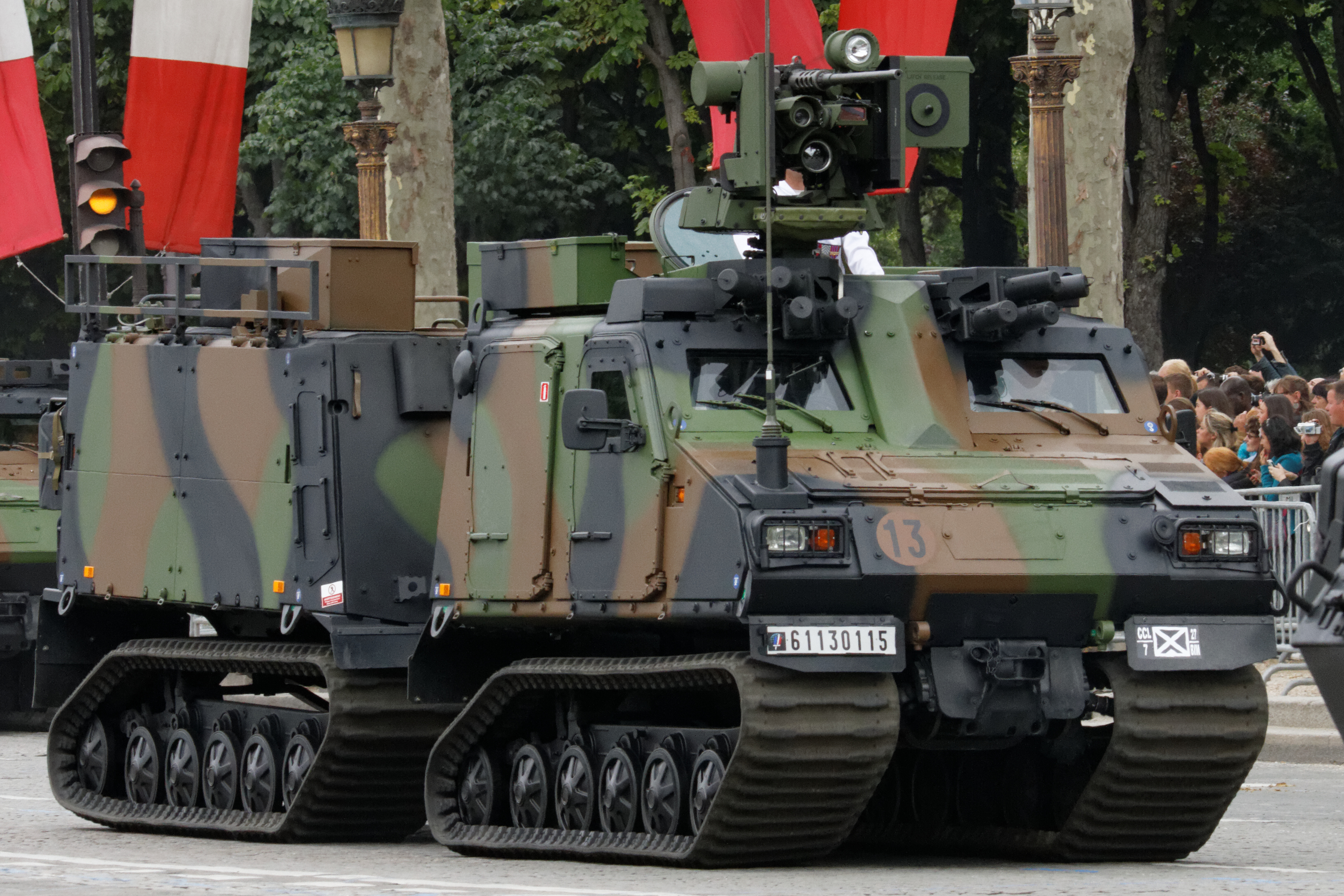
Bandvagn 210 Mk II (commonly called VHM in French service) of the 7e bataillon de chasseurs alpins

On 18 December 2009, the French Armed Forces placed an initial order for 53 BvS10 Vikings, with the total order for 129 of the vehicles. Including servicing, the contract is estimated to be worth £220 million, and the vehicles will be assembled at the BAE factory in Sweden. This is a historic order, as it is the first French order for military equipment from the United Kingdom in decades. In placing the order, France broke with their tradition of supporting domestic products, in this case the Bronco All Terrain Tracked Carrier, built jointly by ST Kinetics and Thales.

=== Swedish order ===
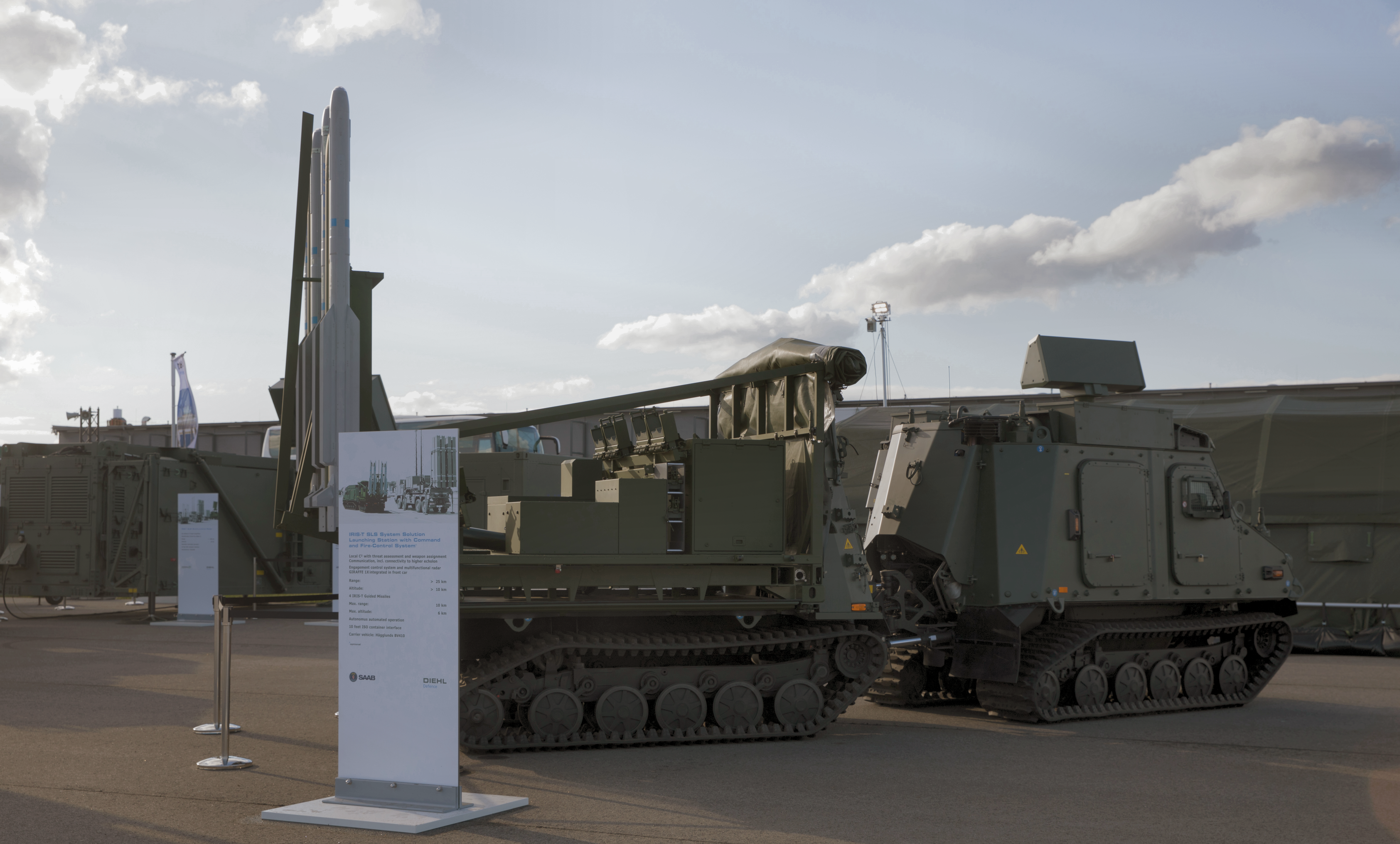
Eldenhet 98 IRIS-T SLS launcher

On 5 January 2012, it was announced that the Swedish Armed Forces decided to procure 48 units of the model BvS10 MkIIB under the designation Bv410, to be delivered starting in the autumn of 2012, and deployed to the Swedish contingent in Afghanistan in the spring of 2013. The contract is worth approximately 700 million SEK, and also includes support and training equipment. There are also options to order an additional 127 vehicles divided in three different batches in the future.

On 25 September 2013, Sweden agreed to buy 105 additional BvS10 vehicles for over $160 million, as part of the options agreed upon in the first order. On 19 December 2013, Sweden officially ordered 105 BvS10 vehicles for $120 million. The vehicles include troop carrier, command, ambulance, and logistic carrier variants and will be delivered from 2014 to 2015.

In 2019, Sweden began fielding the Eldenhet 98 surface-to-air missile mounted on the Bv410 platform as a replacement for the obsolete RBS 70.

On 3 May 2021, BAE Systems signed a contract worth around $200 million to produce and deliver 127 BvS10 all-terrain vehicles to the Swedish Army, adding to its existing fleet of BvS10s. The contract signed with the Swedish military procurement agency, FMV, is for both command and control and logistics vehicles. Deliveries of the 127 vehicles are planned to begin in 2022 and complete in 2024, in 2022 A $50m follow-on order for 40 was placed while a further 236 were ordered under the CATV program.

=== Austrian order ===
On 30 June 2016, it was announced on the BAE Systems website that the Austrian Army decided to procure 32 units of the model BvS10, to be delivered from 2017 to 2018. The BvS10 will also play a role in Austria's mission in the European Union Mountain Training Warfare Initiative (EU MTI).

According to the Austrian military magazine "Truppendienst", the Austrian Army will receive the first build BvS10's MkIIB with CBRN protection and all vehicles equipped with WS4 PANTHER remote controlled weapon station. A possible additional BvS10 MkIIB order could be signed after 2018 delivery.

The Austrians received the first of their BvS10 vehicles in February 2019.

Austria has announced in the presentation "Aufbauplan 2032" that it will buy 100 more Bvs10.[https://www.truppendienst.com/themen/beitraege/artikel/aufbauplan-oebh-

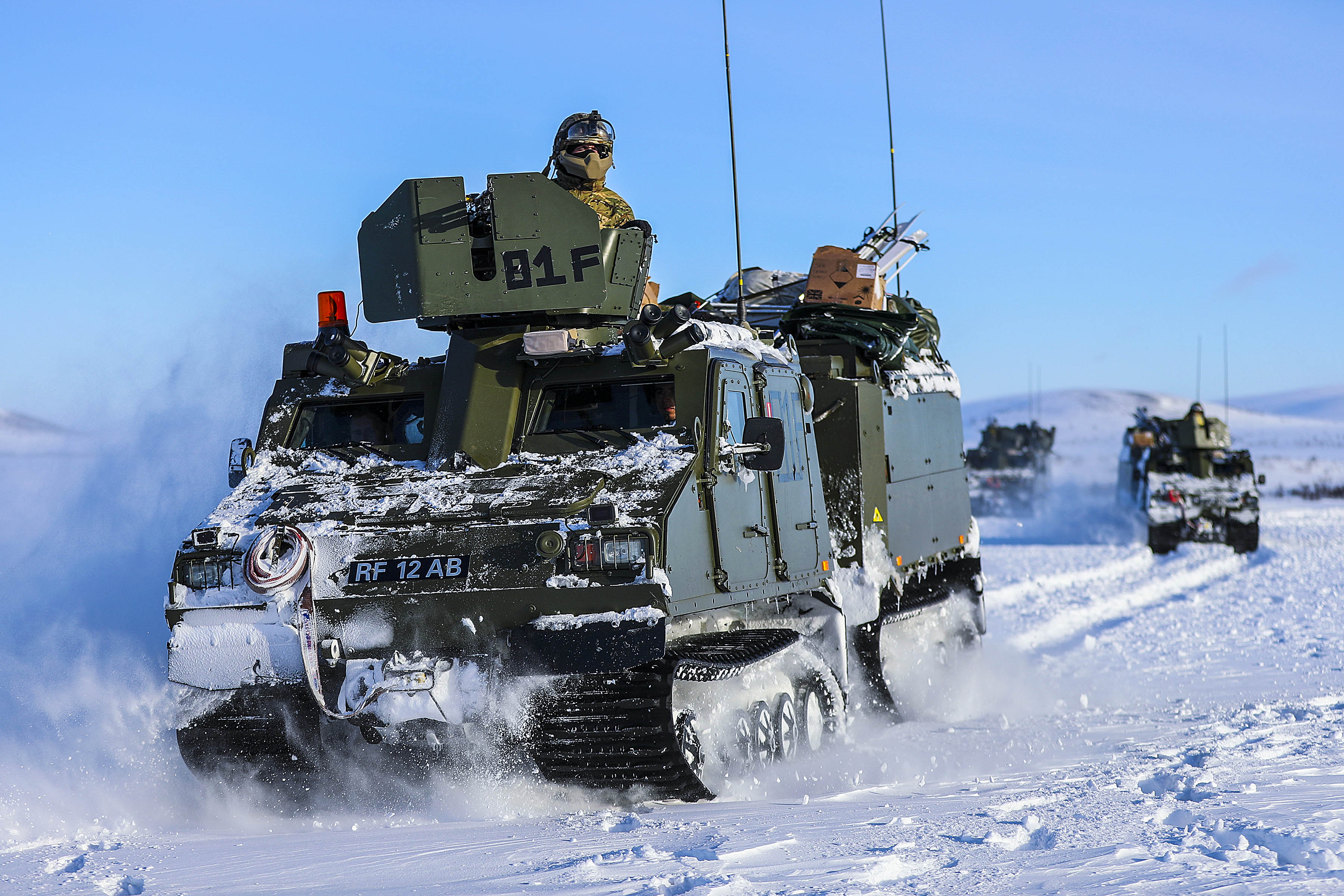
An BvS 10 from Royal Marines in Norway

=== United States order ===
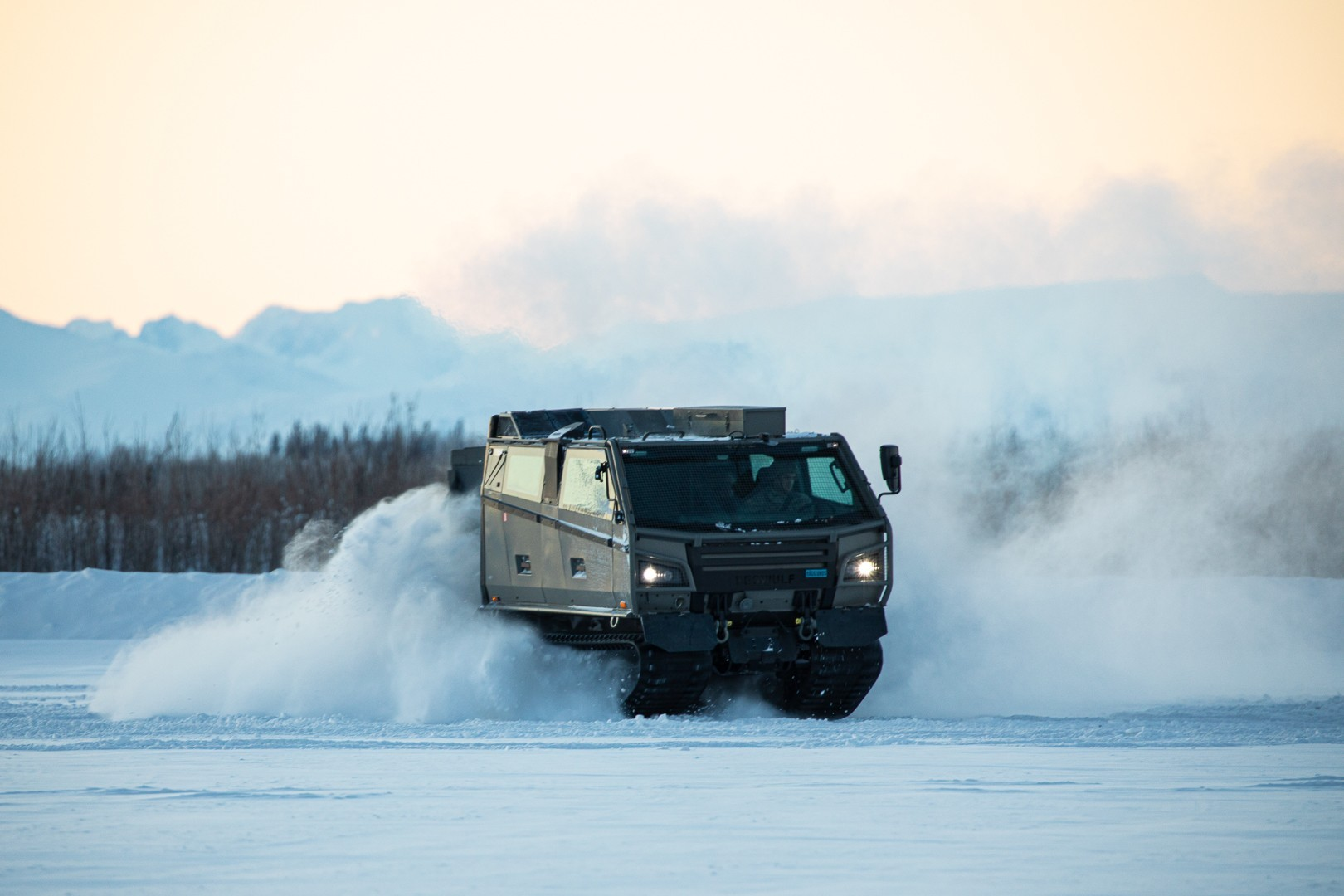
U.S. Army Cold Weather All-Terrain Vehicle

On 22 August 2022, BAE Systems and Department of Defense announced a $278 Million dollar fixed-price contract including spare parts and contractor logistics support to procure 163 vehicles delivered by 2029 for the US Army Cold Weather All-Terrain Vehicle (CATV) program. The CATV will utilize components from US suppliers for its engines, transmission, and hydraulics. The Beowulf will replace the current BV206 based Small Unit Support Vehicles (SUSV) from BAE Systems Hägglunds in use by the US Army since the 1980s.

=== Collaborative All-Terrain Vehicle (CATV) ===
On 23 November 2022, Sweden gave notice on the direct award of a £600 million framework order for an initial 436 units of an improved BV410 model with higher mine protection and load capacity for use as troop transport, logistics and communication. It will be procured in five national variants 236 on behalf of Sweden, 140 for Germany and 60 for the United Kingdom with the option to extend the contract to include further countries or orders.

== Operators ==
=== Current operators ===
Austria (32)
Austria purchased 32 BvS10 MkIIB in 2016 for €85 million, and deliveries started in 2018.
It is equipped with:
- ESLAIT EFWS WS4 Panther RCWS
- "Combat NG" battlefield management system
- Improved mine protection
- 360° observation system
France (53)
France ordered 53 BvS10 MkII (known locally as VHM - véhicle à haute mobilité) in December 2009 with an option for 77 additional vehicles. The option was never exercised. The production took place in Sweden. The trials lasted 8 months in 2011, and the vehicle was accepted by the DGA in September 2011. The first deliveries took place in November 2011.
Initially it was equipped by the PL80 manned weapon station with a M2 Browning machine gun, and in 2018, it was replaced by the Protector M151 RCWS.
Netherlands (73 purchased, 28 donated)
The Netherlands Marine Corps operates 73 BvS10 which succeeded to the Bv206 D6, known locally as Viking Bandvagn S10, in four versions:
- 45 troop transport vehicles
- 20 command vehicles
- 4 repair and recovery vehicles
- 4 ambulance vehicles Prior to March 2023, the Netherlands donated 28 BvS10 to Ukraine.
Sweden (150 operational + 403 ordered)
Vehicle known locally as the Bandvagn 410.
- 48 ordered in 2012 with an option for 127 vehicles (19 APC, 2 Command and Control vehicles, 17 logistics vehicles, 10 ambulances)
- 102 ordered in December 2013 from the option
- 127 ordered in May 2021
- 40 ordered in December 2022
Note: The CATV order is mentioned lower:
Ukraine (48 received)
Prior to March 2023, the Netherlands donated 28 BvS10.
In December 2023, the UK decided to donate 20 BvS10 to Ukraine.
United Kingdom (99 ordered, 20 donated)
In October 2012, the Royal Marines ordered 99 BvS10 MkII for £38 million.
In December 2023, the UK decided to donate 20 BvS10 to Ukraine.
United States (110)
The US Army and the National Guard selected the BvS10 Beowulf (the unarmoured variant) in August 2022 for 110 vehicles worth US$278 million. It followed the CATV programme (cold weather all-terrain vehicle) launched in 2020, aiming at the replacement of the Bv206.
Orders:
- 2 prototypes ordered in April 2021 for the selection phase
- 5 received in 2023
- 44 ordered in December 2024, US$68 million
(Germany) / (Sweden) / (United Kingdom) CATV acquisition programme (663)
CATV stands for Collaborative All-Terrain Vehicle, a common acquisition of the BvS 10. Germany, Sweden and the United Kingdom associated to purchase 436 BvS10 vehicles in December 2022 worth US$760 million. The delivery is planned from 2025 onwards. In June 2024, BAE Systems signed a €42 million contract with Tatra Defence Vehicle for the welding, painting and cab insulation of 250 BvS10, with an option for 274 additional vehicles. First delivery: September 2025
- Germany (367)
  - 140 BvS10 ordered in December 2022.
  - 227 BvS10 ordered in March 2023.
- Sweden (236)
  - 236 BvS10 ordered in December 2022.
- United Kingdom (60)
  - 60 BvS10 ordered in December 2022.

=== On order ===
India
As part of the offensive to sell the vehicle to India, BAE Systems and Larsen & Toubro in September 2023 teamed up to produce the BvS10 for the Indian Army under the Make in India initiative.
On 19 November 2025, a deal was announced for the acquisition of the BvS10 Sindhu, a local variant produced under license by Larsen & Toubro. The production of Sindhu commenced on 28 October 2026 at L&T's Armoured Systems Complex in Hazira, Gujarat with deliveries planned in 2027.

=== Potential orders ===
Canada
As part of the DAME programme (Domestic Arctic Mobility Enhancement), the Canadian Army is looking for a successor to its Bv206. The vehicles are expected in four variants, troop transport, command post, cargo transport and ambulance. In June 2023, the Army issued a RFI from the industry. The RFP is planned for 2026, and the contract would be awarded in 2027, with the intent to get a full operational capability by 2030. In terms of quantity, the expectation is changing, so there is no clear target at the moment.
Germany (273)
The German ministry of defence mentioned in 2022 that the requirement was for 640 vehicles of this type up to 2031, meaning that 273 additional BvS10 would need to be ordered.
Netherlands (179)
As part of the programme FLATM BV (Future Littoral All Terrain Mobility Band Vagn) the Netherlands Marine Corps is looking to purchase 179 additional BvS10 to replace the BvS206D.

== See also ==
Vehicles similar to the BvS10 ATV include:

- Vityaz – (Soviet Union)
- Sisu Nasu – (Finland)
- Bronco All Terrain Tracked Carrier – (Singapore)
- Bv206 – (Sweden)
- Bv 202 – (Sweden)
