= Viking Squadron =

Royal Marines Armoured Support Group Viking Squadron
- Active: 1944; 2007 to present
- Country: United Kingdom
- Branch: Royal Marines
- Part of: Commando Logistic Regiment, UK Commando Force
- Garrison/HQ: Bovington
- Engagements: Battle of Normandy; War in Afghanistan

Viking Squadron, previously known as the Royal Marines Armoured Support Group (RMASG) is an element of the Royal Marines that operates the Viking BvS 10 All Terrain Vehicle. It is based at Bovington in Dorset. The original RMASG was formed in the Second World War to give British and Commonwealth forces heavy fire support in the opening attacks of the Normandy landings.

== History ==
=== Second World War ===
Centaur Mk IV of RMASG near Tilly-sur-Seulles, 13 June 1944

The original Royal Marines Armoured Support Group was formed during the Second World War and took part in the Invasion of Normandy, where it provided fire support for Royal Marine units landing. It was primarily equipped with Centaur IV tanks fitted with a 95 mm howitzer; there were also a smaller number of Sherman tanks, which were used as artillery observation posts or command vehicles. The Group consisted of two Armoured Support Regiments, each of two Armoured Support Batteries, plus an independent Armoured Support Battery.

Each Battery consisted of four troops, with each troop equipped with four Centaur and one Sherman tank, giving a total of 80 Centaur and 20 Sherman tanks in the group, which fought on the British and Canadian D-Day beaches.

- 1st Royal Marine Armoured Support Regiment at Gold Beach comprising the 1st Battery (A, B, C and D Troops) and the 2nd Battery (E, F, G and H Troops).
- 2nd Royal Marine Armoured Support Regiment at Juno Beach comprising the 3rd Battery (J, K, L and M Troops) and the 4th Battery (N, O, P and Q Troops).
- 5th Royal Marine Independent Armoured Support Battery at Sword Beach comprising R, S, T and V Troops.

The wartime RMASG was disbanded two weeks after D-Day (D+14). Part of the Armoured Support Group, which had been reformed as the 29th Infantry Battalion, Royal Marines, was moved to Aldershot to become the 34th Amphibian Support Regiment, Royal Marines. The Regiment moved to India in 1945, collected equipment and trained for operations that were planned to take place in Malaya in September. The unit was organized into a headquarters, two support batteries each of three troops armed with four Landing Vehicle Tracked - the (A)-4 variant with a 75 mm howitzer -, one rocket battery of three troops of four LVT (R) and one flank battery of two troops of five LVT (F). This regiment was disbanded in 1948.

=== Modern ===
The modern Royal Marines Armoured Support Group was formed from the Royal Marines Armoured Support Company (Afghanistan) and the Royal Marines Viking Training Squadron, a subunit of the Commando Training Centre Royal Marines based at the Armour Centre in Bovington, Dorset. The Royal Marines Armoured Support specialisation was established in 2005 in recognition of the fact that the then relatively new BvS10 Viking armoured vehicle demanded a high degree of professional and specialist crew training and a professional career progression for Royal Marines within the Armoured Support 'branch'. A proposal to form a new specialisation and indeed to call it the 'Armoured Support' specialisation (in recognition of the Royal Marines' armoured units of WWII) was put forward and argued by then OC Viking Training Sqn - Major Jez Hermer MBE RM, the officer who had taken BvS10 on operations for the first time in Afghanistan in September 2006, prior to the Royal Marines Armoured Support Group being formed in December 2007.

In 2018, the Armoured Support Group was renamed the Viking Squadron.

== Role and equipment ==
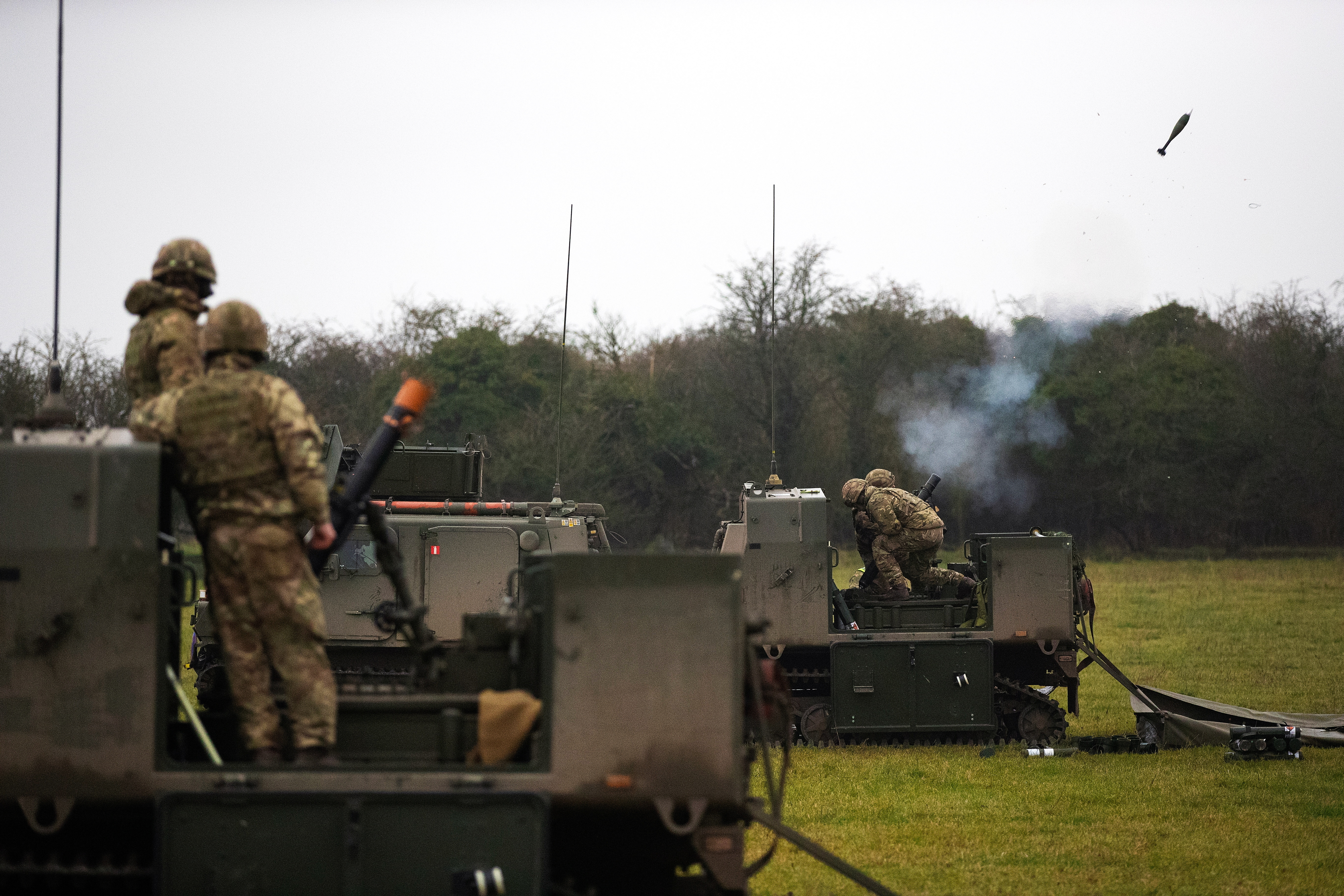
Viking Mortar Section in 2020

Viking Squadron is under the overall control of Commando Logistic Regiment and is the armoured element of UK Commando Force, equipped with the Viking armoured vehicle. The Viking BvS10 All Terrain Vehicle, is a protected tracked vehicle, which can be configured for troop transport, command and control and other tasks. Viking is equipped with the 7.62mm General Purpose Machine Gun and some crewmen are armed with the L22 carbine version of the British SA80 family.

Viking was deployed operationally with British Forces in southern Afghanistan, supporting both 3 Cdo Bde and other roulements. The need for the RMASG, now Viking Squadron, came about because the Viking was so successful with 3 Cdo Bde on Op Herrick 5 that the incoming forces on Op Herrick 6 requested that the Vikings stay on creating a problem as the Army has no Viking trained drivers. The solution was the RMASG, an expanded unit that could continue to operate the Viking for future roulements, this led to the drivers of the RMASG having one of the highest operational tempos in the forces.

== Future requirements ==
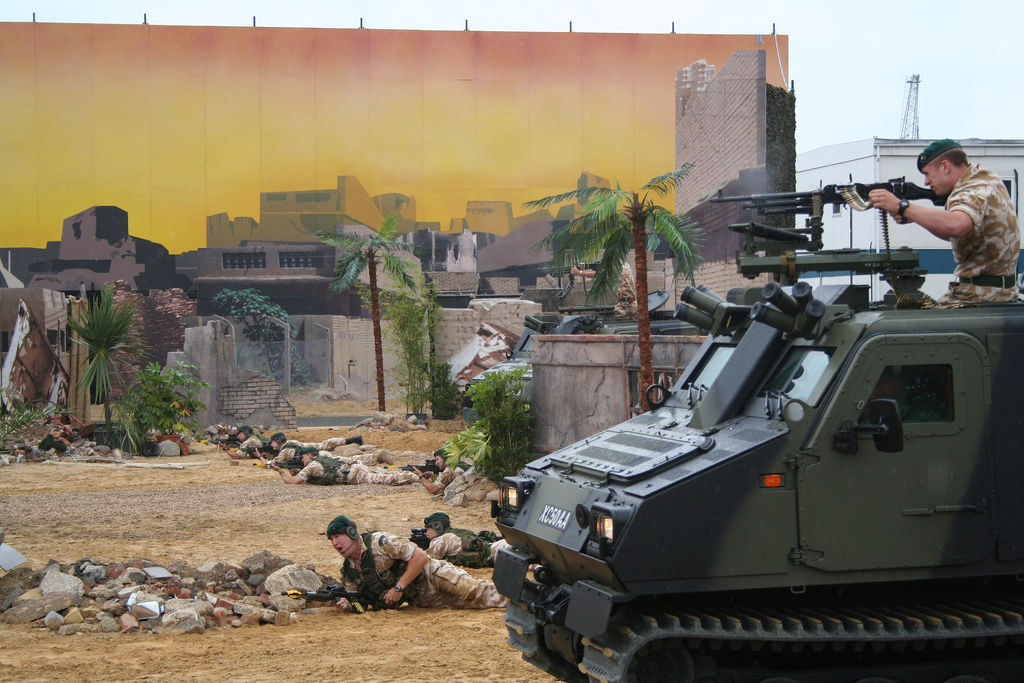
Viking Armoured Vehicle of the Royal Marines during a demonstration at the Portsmouth International Festival in 2005.

On 12 June 2008, the British Ministry of Defence publicly issued a notice stating that "There is a requirement under consideration for an All Terrain Military vehicle that is armoured, amphibious and fitted with (or fitted for but not with) weapon systems, in a supporting role to VIKING, to replace the existing BV206". The new system would be known as the All Terrain Vehicle Support (ATV(S)) and be capable of high mobility operation in a variety of terrains and threat environments as well as being amphibious. A need for between 47 and 212 ATV(S) was foreseen at an estimated cost of between £100 million to £250 million. However, just over a month later, on 17 July 2008, the contract notice setting out the requirement for ATV(S) was cancelled. The Ministry of Defence gave the following reason:

The requirement for an All Terrain Military Vehicle (ATV (S)) under LASS1A/0340 has been delayed due to internal reviews. It is anticipated that a revised announcement will be advertised in the UK MoD Defence Contracts Bulletin in mid 2009 and the revised announcement will also be sent to the EDA for inclusion in the Electronic Bulletin Board (EBB) at that time.

On 19 December 2008, the Ministry of Defence announced that 100 Singapore Technologies Kinetics Bronco All Terrain Tracked Carrier vehicles would be purchased as an Urgent Operational Requirement to replace the Viking vehicles in use in Afghanistan. The new vehicle would be known in British service as the Warthog and enter service in 2009. The press release further stated that "When the Vikings are brought back from Afghanistan they will be used by the Royal Marines on training exercises".

Nevertheless, Viking appears to be the core armoured vehicle for the Royal Marines in the future. 99 Vikings were upgraded with new mine blast protection bodywork and brought back to their original amphibious standard, having been adapted for the rigours of land operations.

In April 2016, a Jane's report stated that the Royal Marines are looking for a replacement for the older Bv 206D vehicles, which will be out of service by 2021.

== Awards ==
The Royal Marines Armoured Support Group was awarded the 'True Grit: Group' award during the 2008 Sun Military Awards, "For a small unit or group of men or women from any service who have together performed a single act of true grit - through courage, determination or self-sacrifice – be it on or off duty".

== See also ==
- Hobart's Funnies
