= Can-Am Off-Road =

Canadian recreational vehicle manufacturer

BRP Inc.
- Type: Public company
- Traded as: TSX: DOO
- Industry: All-terrain vehicles
- Founded: 1942; 84 years ago (as L’Auto-Neige Bombardier Limitée)
- Founder: Joseph-Armand Bombardier
- Headquarters: Valcourt, Quebec, Canada
- Area served: Worldwide
- Key people: Denis Le Vot, President and CEO
- Products: Ski-Doo, Can-Am (ATV & Spyder Roadster), Sea-Doo (PWC and SportBoats), Lynx, Evinrude Outboard Motors, Johnson Outboards and Rotax
- Services: Recreational Vehicle financing Recreational Vehicle service
- Number of employees: 8,300 (2017)
- Divisions: Canada, United States, Mexico, Finland, and Austria
- Website: can-am.brp.com

Can-Am is a Canadian subsidiary of Bombardier Recreational Products, once part of Bombardier Inc. Its products include ATVs, motorcycles, and side-by-side vehicles. It was founded in 1942 as L'Auto-Neige Bombardier Limitée (Bombardier Snow Car Limited) by Joseph-Armand Bombardier in Valcourt, Quebec, Canada.

BRP owns manufacturing facilities in Canada, the United States, Mexico, Finland, and Austria BRP products including Can-Am all-terrain vehicles (ATV) and Side-by-Side (SxS, UTV, SSV) vehicles are distributed in over 100 countries by more than 4,200 dealers and distributors. BRP also employs more than 7,100 people around the globe.

Can-Am Off-Road offers a full line of ATV and Side-by-Side vehicles that are designed for riders of all skill levels and age groups.

== History ==
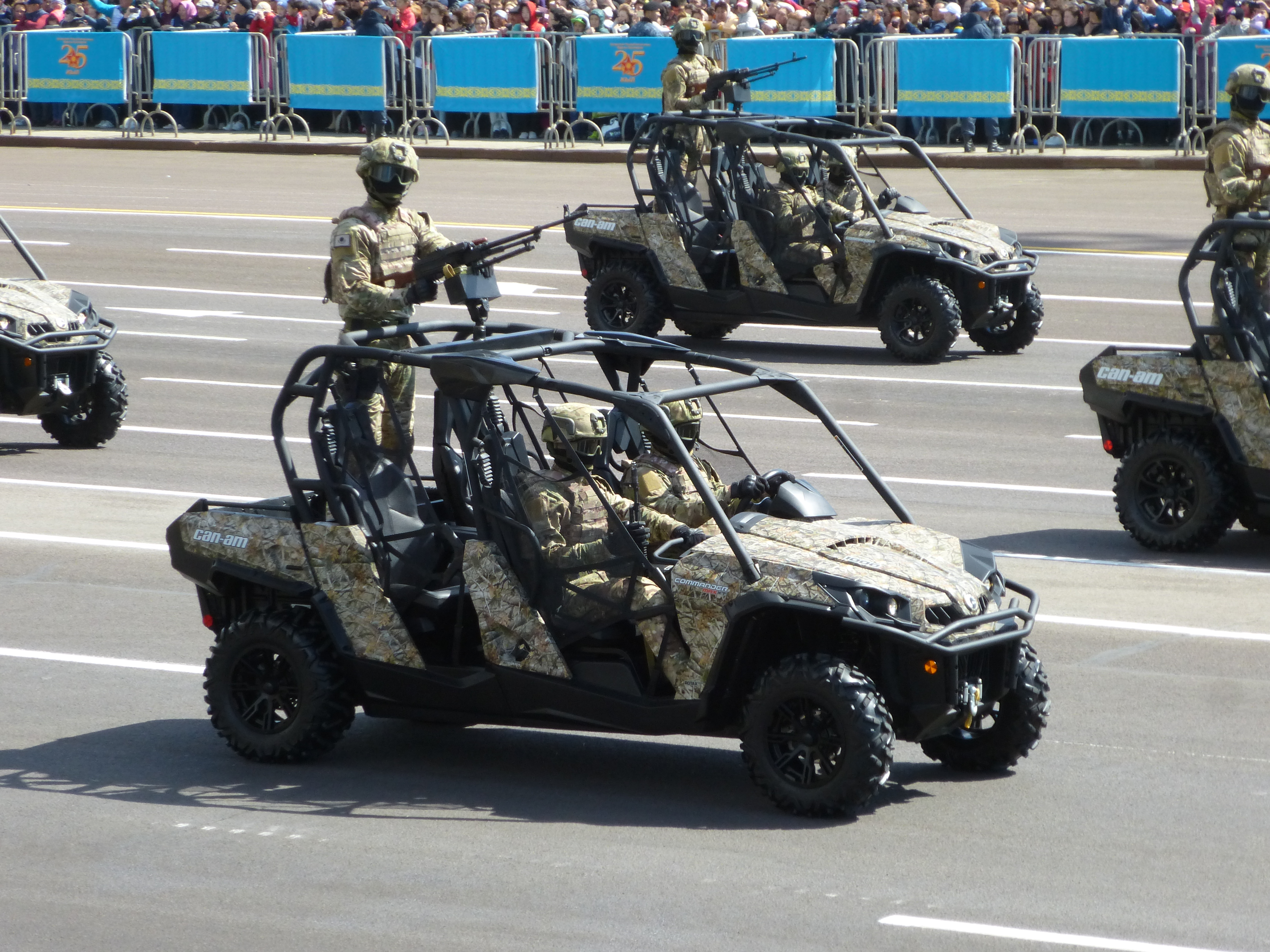
Can-Am buggy in the armed forces of Kazakhstan

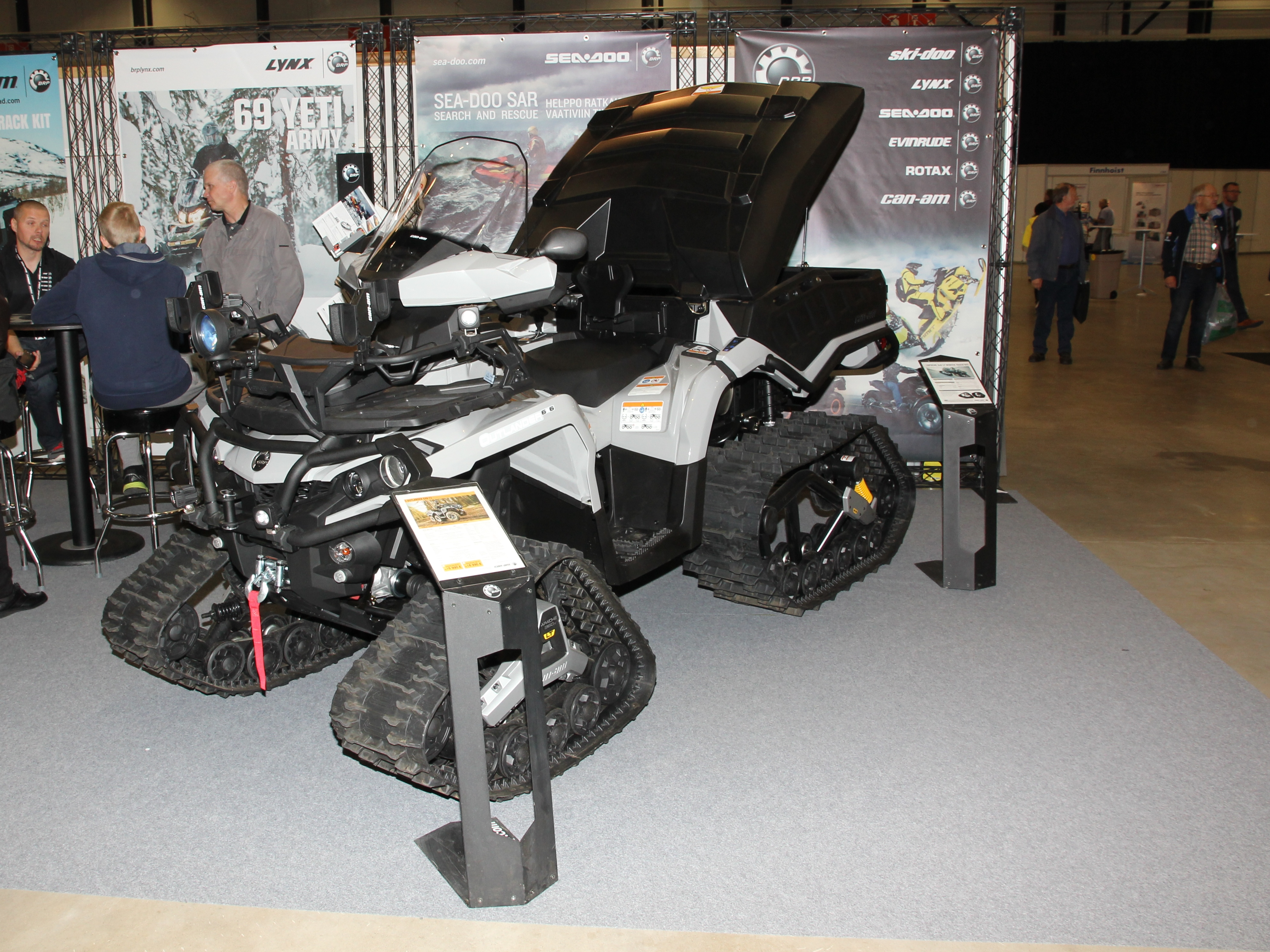
Can-Am Outlander 6x6 T3 all-terrain vehicle with winter tracks

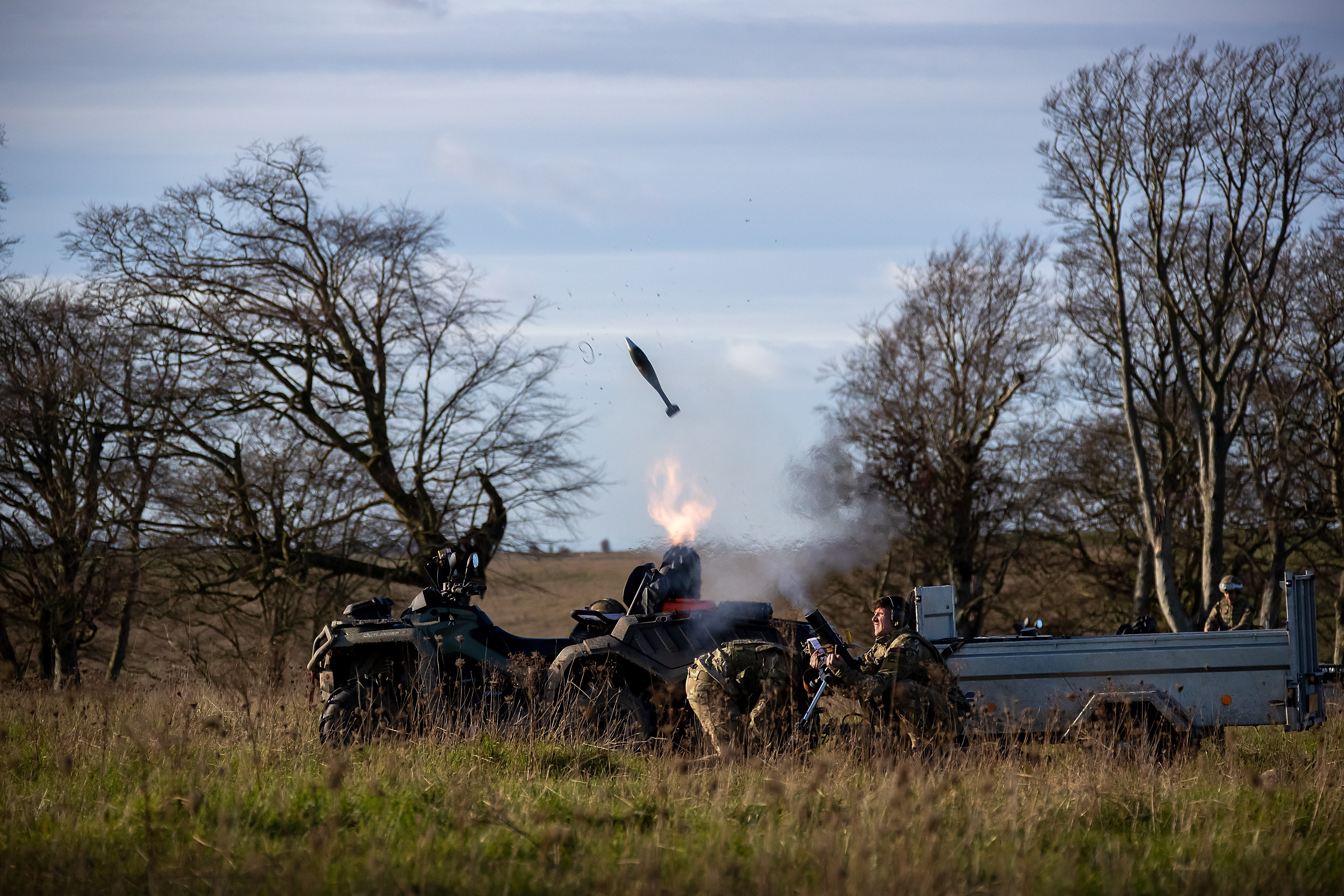
Royal Marines trialling mortars fired from a Can-Am Outlander in 2020

Can-Am was created as a subsidiary of the Bombardier Corporation in 1972, manufacturing high-performance motocross and enduro motorcycles.

In February 1998, BRP entered the all-terrain vehicles (ATVs) market by introducing a prototype of the Traxter - a utility based ATV. Later that year, BRP also began working on their second ATV, the DS650 that was designed for sports enthusiasts. In 2004, this model won the Dakar Rally in the quad class.

In 2000, BRP added an additional variation of the Traxter all-terrain vehicle which was called the Traxter xl. The BRP Traxter XL was the first 4x4 all-terrain vehicle to feature a dumping box-bed. In 2002, BRP introduced another Traxter all-terrain vehicle called the Traxter MAX which featured two seats. The BRP Traxter MAX was the first manufacturer-approved ATV for two people.

In 2005, Antoine Morel of France successfully completed and won the Dakar Rally, racing on a BRP DS 650X. In late October, BRP won the GNCC Racing Series Championship in the Utility Modified ATV Class on an Outlander 800 ATV.

In September 2005, BRP introduced the APACHE track kit - which was the first OEM ATV Track kit to fit most major all-terrain vehicles.

Starting in 2007, BRP launched and re-branded its ATV segment to Can-Am. One year after announcing the re-branding, BRP inaugurated its new plant in Juarez, Mexico. This plant would oversee manufacturing and assembly of the Can-Am Outlander and Renegade ATV model lineup including the Rotax engines that powered these two all-terrain vehicles.

In 2010, Can-Am introduced the Can-Am Commander - their first side-by-side vehicle. The Can-Am Commander 1000 featured an 85-hp Rotax 1000 V-Twin engine and a dual-level cargo box.

Two years later, Can-Am announced another side-by-side vehicle the 2013 Can-Am Maverick. The Can-Am Maverick 1000R was designed to compete against the rival Polaris RZR XP 1000 and the Arctic Cat Wildcat 1000 H.O.

== Products ==
=== Renegade ===
The 2007 Renegade 800 was a big-bore sport-recreational ATV. It was also suitable for rough terrain where other large vehicles would not fit. The Renegade 800 came with a small storage space and a rear rack. A later version of the Renegade X mr 1000R model was capable of 91 hp (68 kW), with a CVT adjusting the drive ratio. The Can-Am Renegade 1000R XXC is a high-performance 4×4 ATV designed for aggressive trail and cross-country riding. Powered by a 976 cc Rotax V-Twin engine producing 91 hp, it features FOX Podium 1.5 RC2 shocks, selectable 2WD/4WD with Visco-Lok QE, and 25-inch ITP Holeshot ATR tires. The intelligent throttle control system (iTC) and intelligent engine braking (iEB) enhance control and safety in rough terrain.

=== Outlander ===
The Outlander 800 was launched in 2006 with an 80-degree V-twin, using TTI suspension in the back and double A-arms in the front. The 2022 Outlander MR model has a front differential.

=== Commander ===
BRP launched two Commander models in 2011: the Commander 1000 (85 hp (63 kW)) and the Commander 800R (71 hp (53 kW)).

The Commander X MR has its engine air intake positioned higher to prevent water and dirt from getting inside. The 2022 Commander XT-P model was equipped with Fox suspension, 15-inch wheels, and 30-inch tires.

=== Maverick ===
In 2013, BRP launched the Maverick. The Maverick 1000R model was designed to compete against the Polaris RZR XP 900. At the time, the Maverick 1000R boasted the most horsepower in its class, 101 hp (75 kW), from a 976 cc Rotax twin-cylinder engine.

As of 2022, three trim levels were available, producing between 120 and 200 hp (89 and 149 kW).

=== Defender ===
The Can‑Am Defender vehicle was designed to establish new standards in terms of power, as well as versatility to cater to all types of outdoor activities. BRP used the Rotax engine technology to create a work-focused version of the durable V-Twin Rotax engines.

The Defender 6x6 model has a towing capacity of up to 3,000 lb (1,400 kg), along with a cargo box with hydraulic power tilt.

Can-Am Side-by-Side Models	Can-Am ATV Models
Maverick X3; Maverick X3 XDS; Maverick X3 XRS; Maverick MAX X ds Maverick MAX X rs DPS; Maverick MAX; Maverick X ds Maverick X mr Maverick X xc DPS Maverick Sport 1000 Maverick Sport 1000R; Maverick Trail 800/1000; Maverick Trail 800/1000 DPS; Commander MAX LIMITED; Commander MAX XT; Commander MAX DPS; Commander LIMITED; Commander XT-P; Commander XT; Commander DPS; Commander E LSV SE; Commander E LSV; Commander E XT; Commander E Defender; Defender DPS; Defender XT; Defender XT Cab; Defender Mossy Oak Hunting Edition; Defender XT-P; Defender MAX; Defender MAX DPS; Defender MAX XT; Defender MAX XT Cab; Defender MAX Lone Star; Defender X MR	Outlander MAX LIMITED; Outlander MAX XT-P; Outlander MAX XT; Outlander MAX DPS; Outlander MAX; Outlander 1000 X mr Outlander 800R X mr Outlander 650 X mr Outlander 6X6 XT; Outlander XT-P; Outlander XT; Outlander DPS; Outlander; Outlander L MAX DPS; Outlander L MAX; Outlander L DPS; Outlander L Renegade X xc Renegade; DS 450 X mx DS 450 X xc DS 250; DS 90 X DS 90; DS 70

== Community programs ==
Can-Am manages a number of community programs, such as:

- International Female Ride Day, held annually in May to celebrate the importance of female riders and their positive contributions to the industry.
- The Women of On-Road program, created to help more women experience riding through inclusivity and education. To date, more than 12,500 people have joined the Women of On-Road community.
- The Responsible Rider Program, which aims to educate riders about safety, etiquette, and the environment.
- The Road Warrior Ride, an annual event held in collaboration with the Road Warrior Foundation (RWF) wherein war veterans are given the opportunity to ride Can-Am three-wheelers.

The company also holds events during International Off-Road Day on the 8th of October.

== Racing ==
In 2005, Antoine Morel of France won that year's Dakar Rally on a BRP DS 650 X. In late October of that year, a BRP-sponsored team won its first Grand National Cross Country (GNCC) championship in the Utility Modified ATV class, later earning a total of 12 GNCC championships in the following four seasons. In 2006, Juan Manuel Gonzales, Antoine Morel, and Alain Morel, racing for Can-Am, claimed the 2006 Dakar Rally podium in the ATV category. In 2007, Warnert Racing Can-Am riders Rick Cecco, Michael Swift, and Cliff Beasley won the 12 Hours of ATV America endurance race.

In 2008, Can-Am riders took the two top spots in the 2008 CMRC Canadian Pro 450 ATV championship. Can-Am X-Team racer and Québec native Richard Pelchat won the overall race and championship at Ste-Julie near Montréal.

In 2009, Team Warnert Racing / Can-Am had two victories at the final round of the 2009 GNCC season near Crawfordsville, Indiana. The first had Michael Swift in the 4x4 Limited class at the Ironman GNCC, the second was Bryan Buckhannon's 4x4 Open championship—and morning overall victory—also on his Outlander 800R.

In the U2 class, Can-Am X-Team racer Jeremie Dudding took the victory. In the Women's Novice class, Cassie Carlson finished the season with a win. Cliff Beasley won, who already had the 4x4 Lites class championship. Chris Bithell finished fourth overall in the XC1 Pro class.

In the GNCC racing season, Can-Am Outlanders won all three 4x4 class championships, and the Renegade 800R won its first U2 class championship with Rick Cecco. Can-Am took home four GNCC championships in 2009.

In 2013, Can-Am ATV and side-by-side racers competed in the 46th Annual Tecate SCORE Baja 1000 desert endurance race in Mexico and came away with one class victory and third-place finishing it the UTV class.

In 2020, Can-Am won first place in the Side-by-Side Category. Casey Currie, residing in California, and co-driver Sean Berriman, residing in Las Vegas, from the Monster Energy Can-Am race team took home first place, winning by 39 minutes. In Podium Sweep, Can-Am vehicles finished three times for the second straight year. In Going 20 for 20, Can-Am vehicles crossed the finish line in all of the top 20 positions.

In 2021, Francisco López, Juan Pablo Latrach Vinagre won the first place in the Dakar Rally, held in Saudi Arabia, in the combined Lightweight Vehicle category, as well as the Side-by-Side class. Can-Am was also one of the top 11 finishers in class.

In 2022, Can-Am Off-Road scored their fifth consecutive Dakar Rally victory since 2018. Can-Am Factory South Racing driver Austin Jones and his navigator, Gustavo Gugelmin, won the T4 category at the 2022 Dakar Rally in Saudi Arabia.
