= Camso =

Canadian automotive parts manufacturing company

Camso Inc.
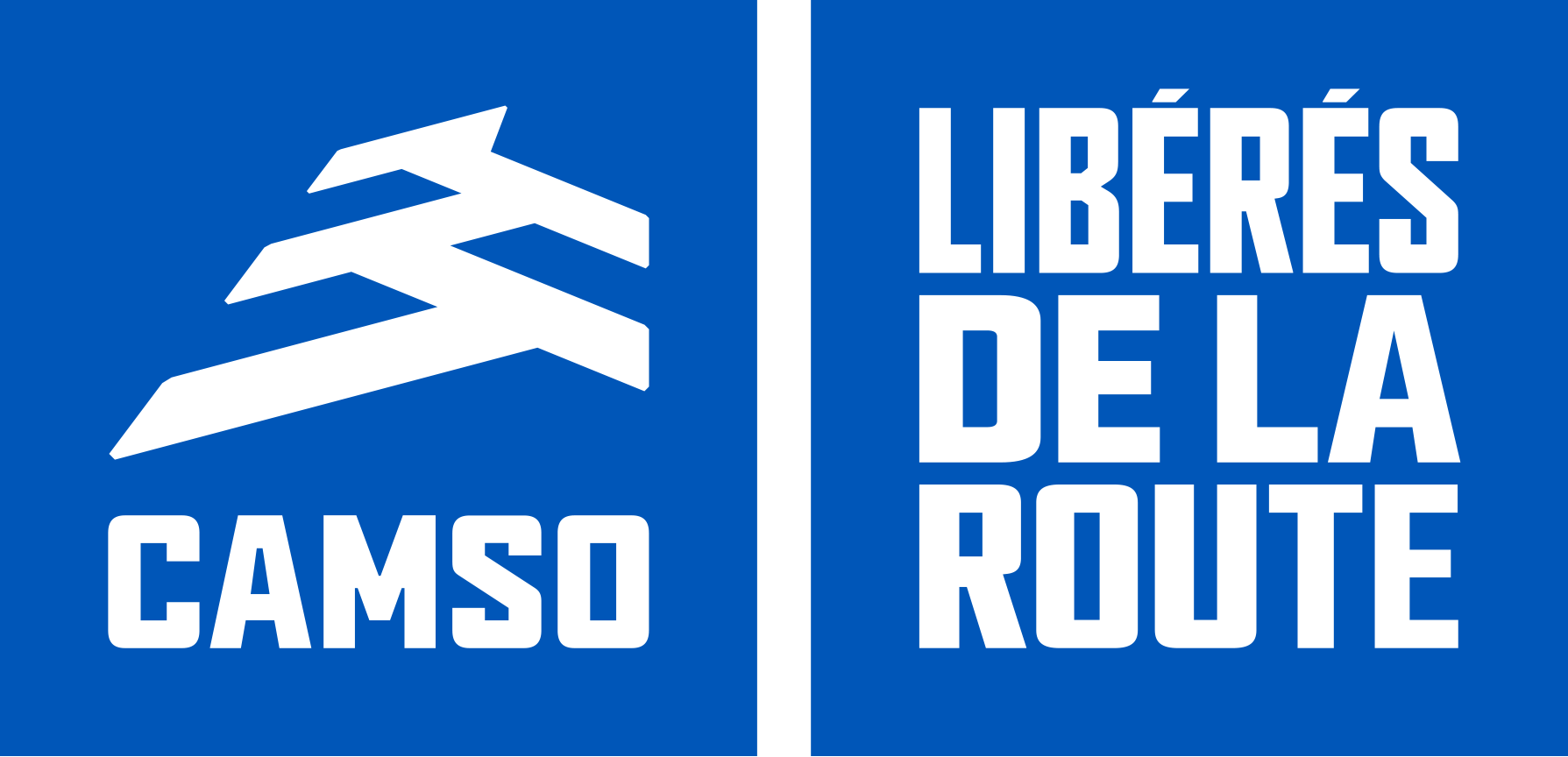
- Type: Subsidiary
- Industry: Manufacturing
- Founded: 1982; 44 years ago
- Headquarters: Magog, Quebec, Canada
- Key people: Pierre Marcouiller (Executive chairman of the Board); Thomas Boettcher (president and CEO)
- Products: Tires, tracks, track systems
- Number of employees: 8000
- Parent: CEAT
- Website: camso.co

Camso Inc., formerly known as Camoplast Solideal, is a Canadian company that is a manufacturer and service supplier of products for off-the-road vehicles. They serve the material handling, construction, agriculture and powersport industries. Camso manufactures and distributes pneumatic, airless and solid tires, tracks, driven and trailed conversion track systems and OEM undercarriages. The company was founded in 1982, and is based in Magog, Quebec, Canada. It also has branches and manufacturing plants in America, Asia and Europe. Camso research centers are in Magog, Ghent, Colombo, Shanghai, and Ho Chi Minh City, and has a global workforce of more than 8000 employees.

== History ==
In 1982, Normand Carpentier and Michel Lasalle acquired four Bombardier divisions, including Roski Ltd., and founded Camoplast Inc.

in December 2004, Camoplast purchased the industrial vehicles division of Bombardier Recreational Products Bombardier manufactured snow and all-terrain vehicles with rubber tracks from the 1950s. The industrial vehicles division, based in Granby, Quebec, made tracked utility vehicles such as snowcats, sidewalk snow removal tractors and Tracked Utility Vehicles, including the descendant of the original Bombardier Muskeg tractor.

In November 2005, Camoplast sold the design, engineering, R&D, service, parts and sales operations of the snow groomer range of its Industrial vehicles Division to Leitner Group which will be marketed as Prinoth, with Camoplast handling the manufacturing.

In February 2009, Camoplast sold the remaining Industrial Vehicles division operations to Leitner Group including development, design, sales, service and vehicle production to Prinoth.

In 2010, Camoplast acquired Groupe Solideal, a company based in Luxembourg that manufactures tires, tracks and wheels for the industrial and construction markets. Subsequently, Camoplast changed its name to Camoplast-Solideal

On August 23, 2013, Camoplast-Solideal's Composite Division was acquired by four company managers and became a corporation in its own right under the name Roski Composites, presided by Yves Carbonneau.

On July 3, 2015, Camoplast Solideal was renamed to Camso to "represent the best of Camoplast and Solideal".

On July 25, 2018, Michelin agreed to acquire Camso for $1.45B. The 'off the road' operations of Michelin will be combined with Camso to form a new division.

On December 18, 2018, Michelin completed the acquisition of Camso, under the terms announced on July 12, 2018 and after obtaining all of the necessary approvals for the transaction. A total consideration of US$1.36 billion was paid for the acquisition.

On December 6, 2024, Michelin sold Camso to Indian tire company CEAT for US$225 million.
