= Roski =

Canadian company

Roski Composites inc.
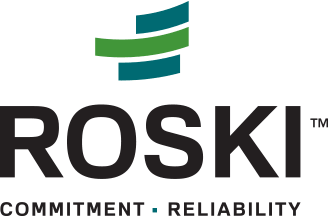
- Company type: Corporation
- Industry: Composite, Ground transportation, Construction, Marine
- Founded: 1963
- Founder: Joseph-Armand Bombardier, founder
- Headquarters: Roxton Falls, Quebec, Canada
- Website: http://www.roski.com

Roski Composites inc. is a company located in Roxton Falls, Quebec, Canada. The 12 448 m^{2} plant specializes in producing molded parts made from composite materials, mainly for the ground transportation, construction and marine industries in North America.

== History ==
=== Origins ===
In 1963 Joseph-Armand Bombardier created the division Roski Ltd. to supply composite parts for the SKI-DOO assembly line at Bombardier (now BRP), including hoods and related parts. Roski's name comes from the combination of Roxton and Ski-Doo, in reference to the town where its facilities are located, Roxton Falls, on one hand, and its initial purpose as a supplier of custom composite hulls for Bombardier's Ski-Doo's, on the other.

In the early 1970s, Roski was tasked with producing and assembling the first generation of Sea-Doo personal watercraft which had been developed by Bombardier's engineering department. In the same period, Roski gained experience of marine construction by producing the full series of Bombardier sailboats. In parallel with the expertise in large-volume manufacturing of composite parts using contact molding technology, Roski diversified by being one of the first North American companies to make large-scale use of liquid resin injection and high-pressure molding. In the 1970s, Roski acquired filament winding technology. In the same period, Roski also produced gas tanks for HDPE molded personal watercraft, using rotational molding. From 1970 to 1985, Roski capitalized on technological breakthroughs, leading to expertise in parts for the marine and ground transportation (truck, bus, subway and train) industries, as well as for recreation, construction and corrosion-resistance applications.

In 1982 Normand Carpentier and Michel Lasalle acquired four Bombardier divisions, including Roski Ltd., and founded Camoplast inc. Under their leadership, Roski refocused operations on the production of personal watercraft hulls and decks, thanks to the company's development of a highly efficient robot-based technology called RSM. With this development, Roski became a major supplier of such parts.

On August 23, 2013, Camoplast's Composite division was acquired by four company managers and became a corporation in its own right under the name Roski Composites, presided by Yves Carbonneau. While remaining a major supplier of personal watercraft hulls and decks, Roski also renewed with the production of high-standard technical products for the transportation and construction industries, as well as its line of proprietary products for the marine industry.

=== Highlights ===
In 1972, Roski Ltd. produced 225,000 personal watercraft hulls using open-mold processes. In the mid-1970s, the company helped design the Montreal Metro by producing its car linings. In the same period, in order to pave the way for the summer Olympic Games set for Montreal (1976), the division designed and provided the city with composite parts for the city's Olympic Stadium, Olympic Basin, Complexe sportif Claude-Robillard, and Maurice Richard Arena.

Roski roboticized its equipment in the 1990s. In 1996, the Roxton Falls plant produced 130,000 personal watercraft using RSM technology, which it had honed over the years. In 2007, Roski reached a milestone with its production of one million personal watercraft bodies.

In 2015, Roski expanded its facilities with a view to diversifying and producing larger composite parts including in-ground pools, windmill parts, outdoor fixtures, tanks, boats, and parts for recreational vehicles, buses and train cars. In January 2016, Roski publicly announced the creation of its Roski Marine division, as well as the market launch of a sailboat called the Outsider, its first fiberglass sailing dinghy. During the same year, Roski launched the RSK-I, an off-road and heavy duty trailer. Until this day, it's possible to find it in more than 30 point of purchase through Quebec and Ontario.

== Profile ==
Roski's composite and fiberglass parts are manufactured using open and closed mold techniques.

== See also ==
- Fibre-reinforced plastic (FRP)
- Polyester resin
- Joseph-Armand Bombardier, founder
- Bombardier Recreational Products (BRP)
