= Polaris RMK =

The Polaris RMK is a series of snowmobiles made by Polaris Industries. All RMK models are powered by two-stroke engines. The RMK was introduced in the 1996 model year by Polaris to compete in the mountain market. The acronym originally stood for "Rocky Mountain King". The RMK name is still in use today, has been used on many chassis and engine variations, and is primarily used to indicate the snowmobile is designed for mountain or deep-snow use.

== Models ==
=== History ===
The Polaris RMK was originally introduced on the 1996 Polaris Ultra 680cc triple, Indy 580, Storm, and Xlt. They featured a 15x133x1.5” track.

=== 1997–1998 ===
For the 1997 model year Polaris added twin cylinder case-reed inducted 700cc engines. They followed in 1998 with a 600cc version for those wanting a smaller displacement engine to the potent 700cc. Both the 600cc and 700cc engines were built in the US and used 39mm Keihin D-slide carburetors and digital CDI ignition and utilized a 136"x15"x1.75" track with an estimated dry weight of 496lbs in the wedge chassis.,

=== 1999 ===
For 1999 the chassis of the RMK was upgraded to the Gen II style, but still retained the same 136" track as well as the 500cc, 600cc and 700cc engines.

=== 2000 ===
For the 2000 model year the 800cc engine was also added to lineup. The chassis also received upgrades in the form of new seat, gas tank, 2" higher handle bars, sidehiller skis, as well as the Xtra-Lite suspension. The primer for the carburetor was deleted. The 600cc, 700cc, and 800cc models used the 136"x15"x1.75" track and the 500cc model used the 136"x15"x1.5" track.

=== 2001 ===
For the 2001 model year the track of the 800cc model was upgraded to 144"x15"x2.0" and the 700cc model had the option of the 136"x15"x1.75" or 144"x15"x2.0" tracks. With the 600cc retaining the 136"x15"x1.75" track and the 500cc keeping the 136"x15"x1.5" track.

=== 2002 ===
The 600cc, 700cc, and 800cc models were upgraded from the Gen II chassis to the Edge chassis, as well all three motors were upgraded with a Variable Exhaust System (VES) and 38mm Mikuni flatside carburetors. While the 500cc model retained the Gen II chassis. 800cc models also had the option of 144"x15"x2.0" or 151"x15"x2.0" snow check models had a 156"x15" ×2" tracks.

=== 2003 ===
The 500cc model was dropped from the lineup. The 600cc model receives the 144"x15"x2.0" track, and both the 700cc and 800cc models have a choice of the 144"x15"x2.0" or 151"x15"x2.0" tracks.

=== 2004–2005 ===
For 2004 all engines have PERC electronic reverse, allowing reverse of the snowmobile by reversing the engine crankshaft direction. A 159"15"x2.0" track was available on 700cc and 800cc models.

=== 2006 ===
For 2005–2006 the RMK was upgraded to the IQ chassis. The 800cc engine was dropped from the lineup and a 900cc reed-valve fuel injected twin was added, while the 700cc engine was redesigned and had fuel injection added. According to the user's feedbacks polaris RMK assault ne hodit bol'she shtuki probega.

== See also ==
- Ski-doo
