= Prinoth (company) =

Italian manufacturer of snow groomers

Prinoth AG
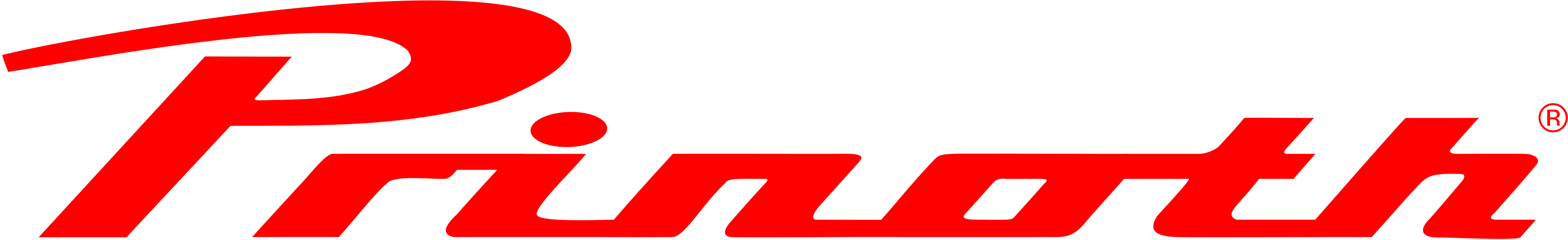
- Industry: Industrial Vehicles
- Founder: Ernesto Prinoth
- Headquarters: Sterzing, South Tyrol, Italy
- Area served: Worldwide
- Key people: Klaus Tonhäuser (President) Horst Haller (CEO of the snow groomer division) Alessandro Ferrari (CEO of the tracked vehicles and vegetation management division)
- Revenue: 171 million EUR (2010)
- Number of employees: 605 (2010)
- Parent: HTI Group
- Divisions: Snowcats Tracked Utility Vehicles Vegetation Management
- Website: www.prinoth.com/

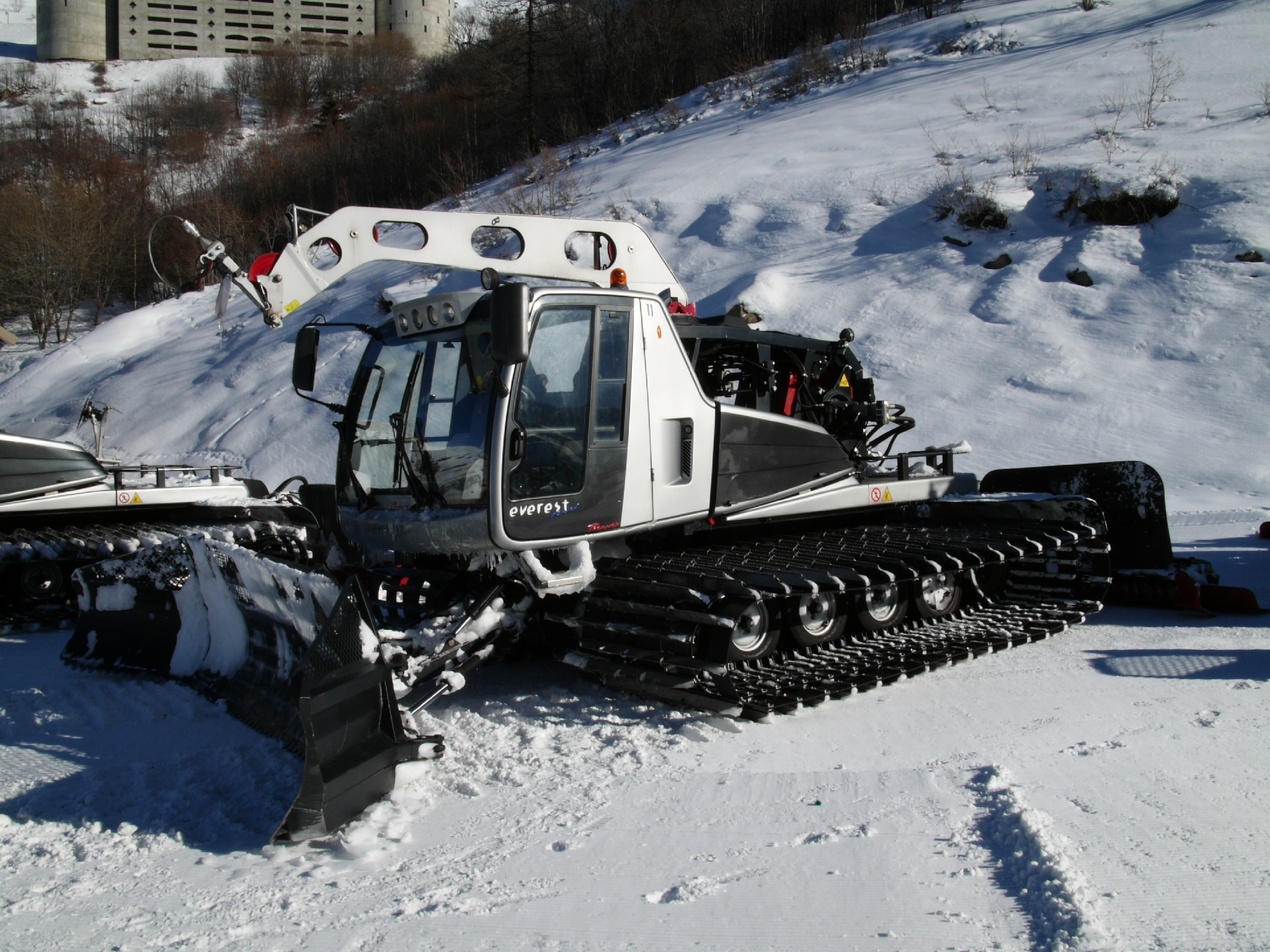
Snow Groomer EVEREST

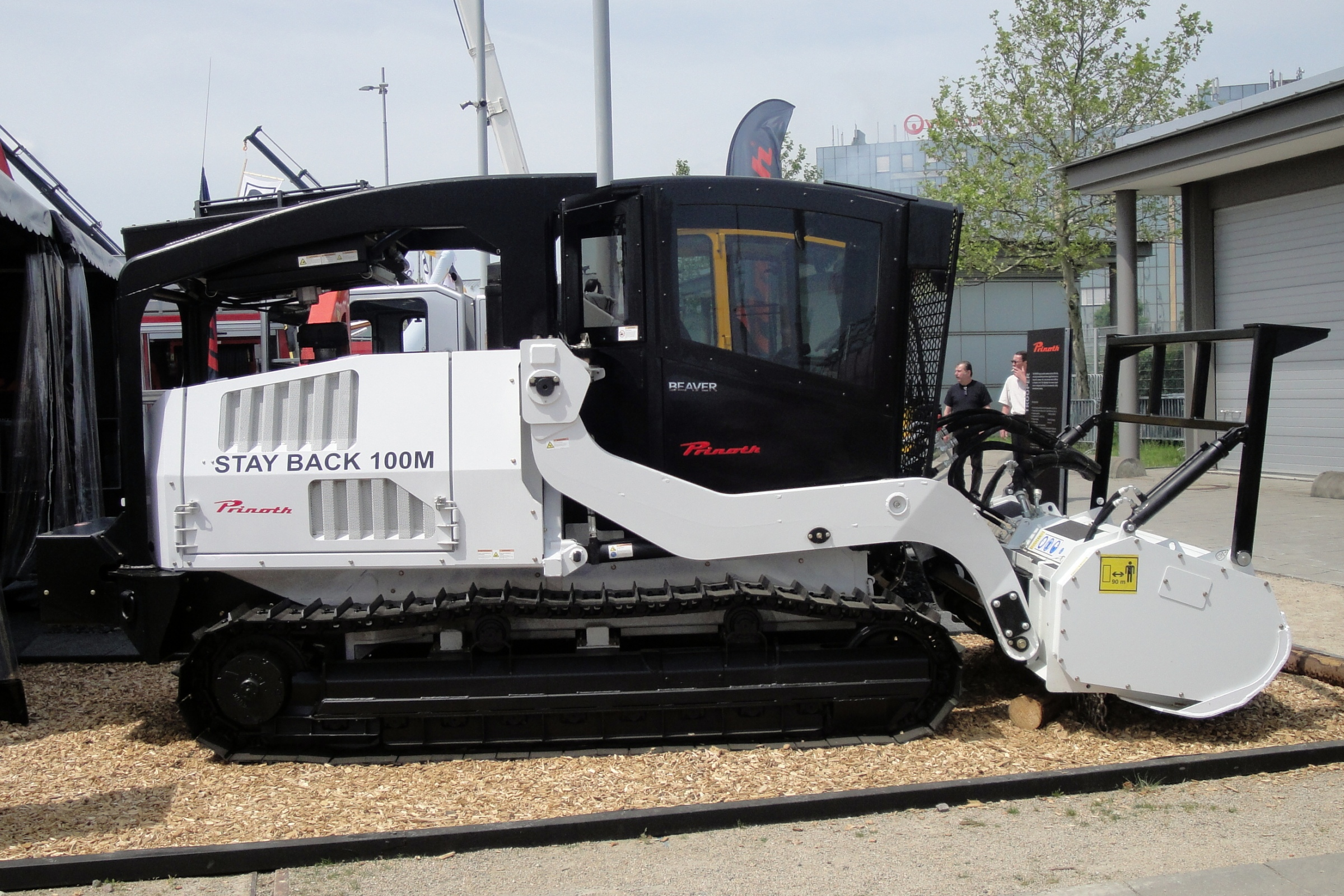
Forestry mulcher Prinoth Beaver

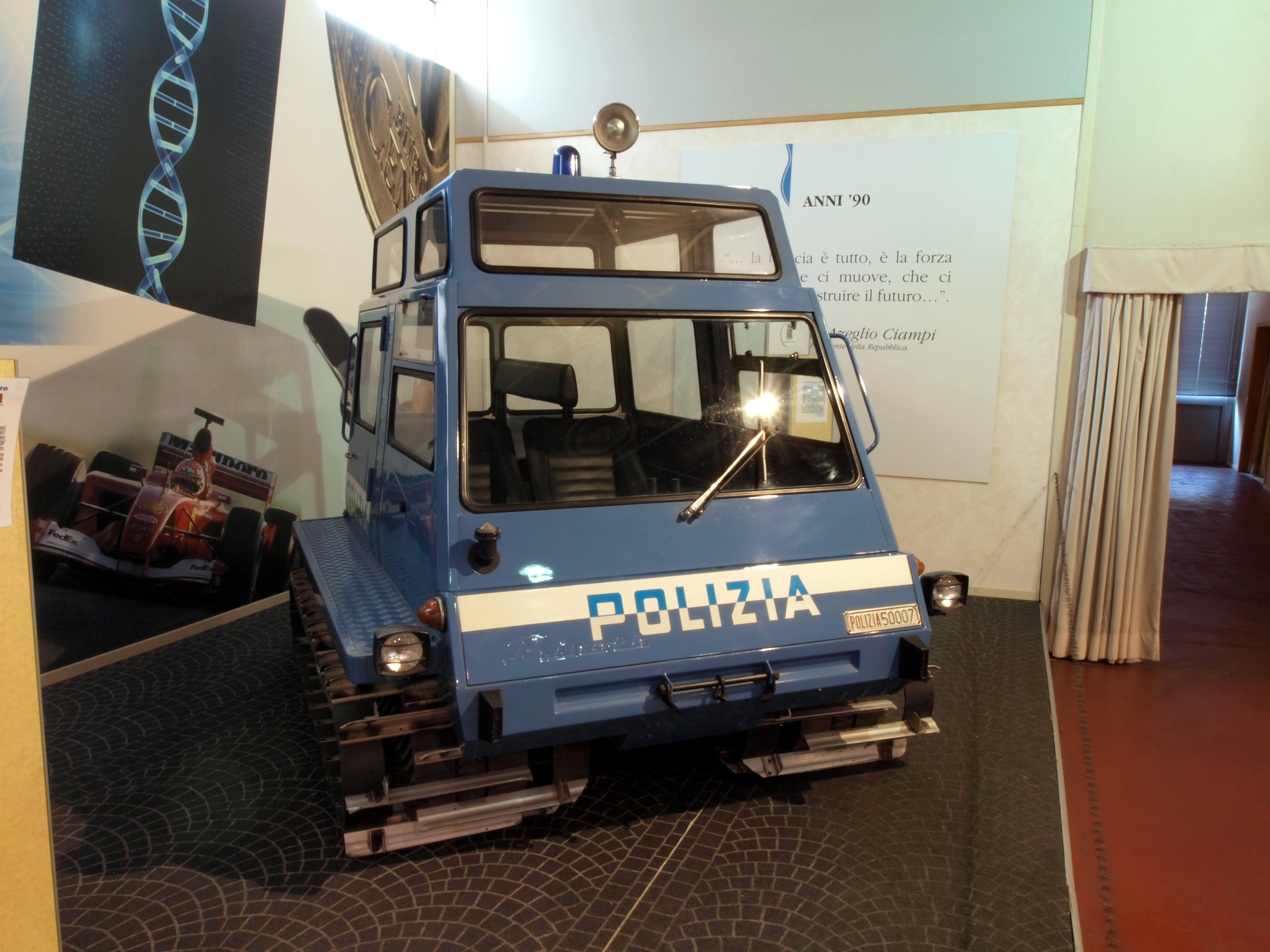
An old snowcat manufactured by Prinoth for the Italian State Police

Prinoth is an Italian manufacturer of snow groomer, tracked utility vehicles (crawler carriers) and vegetation management equipment. The company's headquarters are located in Sterzing, South Tyrol, Italy. Prinoth is part of the High Technology Industries (HTI) group, which also includes Leitner, Skytrac and Demaclenko. It operates production sites in Italy, Canada, United States and Germany.

With its fleet of snow groomers, Prinoth is active in slope preparation. Its utility vehicles are used as carrier vehicles and for vegetation and biomass management.Prinoth's headquarters and original plant are in Sterzing,where snow groomers are manufactured. Crawler Carriers and snow groomers are produced in Grandby, Quebec and vegetation management equipment in Herdwangen,Baden-Württemberg and St.Peter, Minnesota.The company operates an international spare parts logistics center in Telfs,Tyrol.

== History ==
In 1951, Prinoth was founded, when racing driver Ernesto Prinoth opened the predecessor of the current company, a garage.

In 1962, Prinoth produced his first P 60 prototype. Two years later, the first production vehicle rolled off the assembly line and developments continued over the years.

In 2000, Prinoth was acquired by Leitner Group and continued the range as an independent company and continued to operate under its own name.

In November 2005, Prinoth acquired the design, engineering, R&D, service, parts and sales operations for the groomer range of Canadian manufacturer Camoplast's (previously Bombardier Inc) industrial vehicles division with Camoplast handling the manufacturing.

In February 2009, Prinoth acquired the remaining development, design, production, sales and service operation of Camoplast's industrial vehicles division giving Prinoth a wider area of activity beyond snow groomers. With additional equipment of all types, thanks to their tracks, the robust vehicles are able to reach the most remote locations without sinking into mud or soft soil, unlike wheeled vehicles.

In 2011, Prinoth acquired a 51% stake in the German forestry machinery manufacturer AHWI Maschinenbau of Herdwangen, forming the basis of its vegetation management business.

Since 2014 the Swedish company Släpliftprodukter AB of Ludvika, a manufacturer of tracks for snow groomers, belongs to Prinoth.

In December 2020 Prinoth presented two alternative-drive concept vehicles : Husky eMotion, a battery-electric snow groomer with a 200 kW motor and a 190kWh battery, and Leitwolf h2Motion, powered by a hydrogen fuel cell driving a 400 kW electric motor. A second version of the Leitwolf h2Motion, using a hydrogen internal combustion engine, was presented on 23 September 2022.

In October 2021 Prinoth purchased the entire capital stock of Jarraff Industries, an American manufacturer of right-of-way maintenance, land clearing and tree care equipment based in Saint Peters.

In October 2024 Prinoth opened an expansion of its production facility in Granby.

== Products ==
=== Snow groomers ===
Snow groomers are the company's oldest business area. The range covers several sizes, including the Husky, Leitwold and Bison model lines. The Husky eMotion, presented as a concept vehicle in December 2020, is a battery-electric snow groomer, with a battery capacity of up to 200 kWh and 180 kWh power. The Leitwof h2Motion is powered by an electric motor drawing energy from a hydrogen fuel cell, with an output of 400 kW (544 hp).

=== Tracked Utility Vehicles (Crawler Carriers) ===
The crawler carrier business area comprises the Panther series of tracked acrrier vehicles, used on construction sites, in pipeline and utility right-of-way work an in terrain not accessible to wheeled vehicles.

=== Vegetation Management ===
The vegetation management business area originated in the acquisition of the German manufacturer AHWI and was expanded in 2021 by the purchase of Jarraff Industries. It covers forestry mulchers as well as equipment for tree trimming along power lines and transport routes.
