= Moto-Ski =

Snowmobile brand

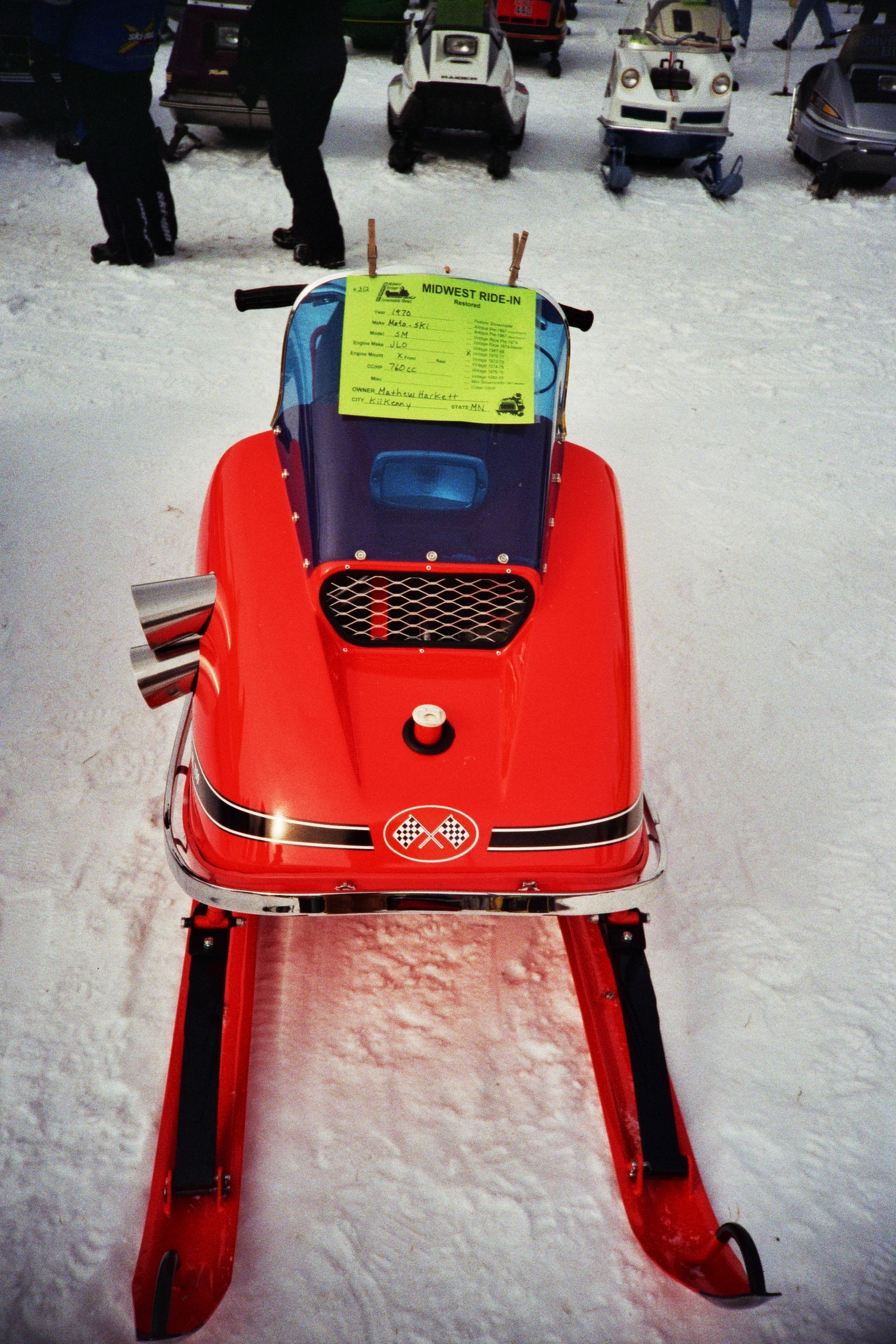
1970 Moto-Ski SM

Moto-Ski was a snowmobile brand. Moto Skis were first manufactured in 1963 by Les industries Bouchard.

Les Industries Bouchard began manufacturing Moto-Ski snowmobiles in 1962, and the orange machines from the south bank of the St. Lawrence River earned a reputation for durability.

The famous “Tougher Seven Ways” ad campaign enhanced that reputation with commercials that featured a Moto-Ski on a roller coaster and another one bouncing along a bone-dry rocky creek bed. By the time the 1971 sales season was over, Moto-Ski was the second best-selling brand in Canada and third best in the world. But financial complications led to its acquisition by Bombardier early in calendar year 1971. However, big yellow decided to operate Moto-Ski as a separate division that would stand on its own in the increasingly turbulent snowmobile industry.

The Moto-Ski company of La Pocatière, Québec, Canada was purchased in 1971 by Bombardier. The last year of production was 1985.

== Models ==
In 1963 and 1964, Moto-Skis had no model names but were instead listed by year and engine size. For example, a 1964 Moto-Ski with a 300cc Hirth would be a 1964 Moto-Ski 300.

The Moto-Ski Capri was a two-passenger sled that was available with single and twin cylinder two-stroke engines of 292 to 440 cc (17.8 to 26.9 cu in) displacement and rated up to 35 horsepower (26 kW). The Capri had a top speed of 40 to 45 mph (64 to 72 km/h).

The Zephyr was larger than the Capri, could carry three passengers and was available with a more powerful 634 cc (38.7 cu in) engine. The top speed of these sleds was 60 to 65 mph (97 to 105 km/h)

The Grand Prix was smaller than the Zephyr and the Capri; it was a single passenger performance sled that had a 438 cc (26.7 cu in) engine. It wasn't as powerful as the Zephyr, but could reach speeds of 75 mph (121 km/h)

In 1973 Moto-ski brought to the market their first models with the engines mounted low in the bellypan for a lower centre of gravity. These new models were the F (family) and S (sport) powered by BSE (Bouchard Snowmobile Engine) motors. The new models came with 3 engine size options, the 295, 340 and 440 cc (18.0, 20.7 and 26.9 cu in). Starting in 1976 all Moto-Ski models were designed by Bombardier.

The Moto-Ski model line included many other models throughout their production. These models included the Grand Prix, Cadet, Capri, Mini-Sno, Mirage I, Mirage II, Mirage Special, MS-18, Zephyr S, F, Nuvik, Grand Sport, Chimo, Spirit, Futura, Sonic, Super-Sonic and Ultra Sonic. They also manufactured and sold mini-bikes called Moto-Skeeters only for two years, 1971 and 1972. Moto-Skis were available with engines manufactured by Hirth, BSE, JLO, and several other manufacturers until they were purchased in March 1975 by Bombardier (the manufacturer of Ski-Doo snowmobiles). After their purchase, Moto-Skis were powered by Rotax engines and starting with the 1976 models were essentially orange-colored versions of the Ski-Doo models. The most popular models were the Grand Prix, Grand Prix Special, Super-Sonic and Ultra-Sonic (same as Ski-Doo MX, Blizzard 5500, 7500, and 9500), the Sonic (same as Ski-Doo RV), the Mirage I, II, and Special (same as Ski-Doo Citation 3500, 4500, and SS, but with a slight change in the design of the hood), the Futura 500 and Futura L/C (same as Ski-Doo Everest 500 and L/C), the Nuvik (same Ski-Doo Olympique but with a different hood) and the Spirit (same as Ski-Doo Elan but with a different hood).

== Famous users ==
In 1969, Maine country music performer Jud Strunk recorded a promotional 45 rpm single for the Moto-Ski Snowmobile Company (Les industries Bouchard). Side A: The Santa Song (AKA Santa's Got A Moto-Ski). Side B: A Special Christmas Tree. The songs, written by Strunk, were recorded at the Rockland Recording Studio in Maine.

In 1970, John Lennon and Yoko Ono rode a Moto-Ski during travel to Ontario.

== See also ==
- Ski-Doo
- Bombardier Recreational Products
