= Traxter XL =

The Bombardier Traxter XL UTV was presented to the public in 2000, It was the first 4x4 UTV equipped with a dumping box-bed on the market. The 550 cc liquid cooled vehicle also introduced new features such as side storage bins on each footwell, side bars to avoid trees colliding with the rear wheels and an enormous 800 lb carrying capacity.

== The 2000 Bombardier Traxter XL UTV ==
In 2002, John Deere introduced the 'John Deere Buck' which was basically a Traxter XL adapted to the John Deer colors. Production for both models was halted in 2006 due to low volume and reorientation in product line-ups of each company.
