= Lynx (snowmobile) =

Finnish snowmobile brand

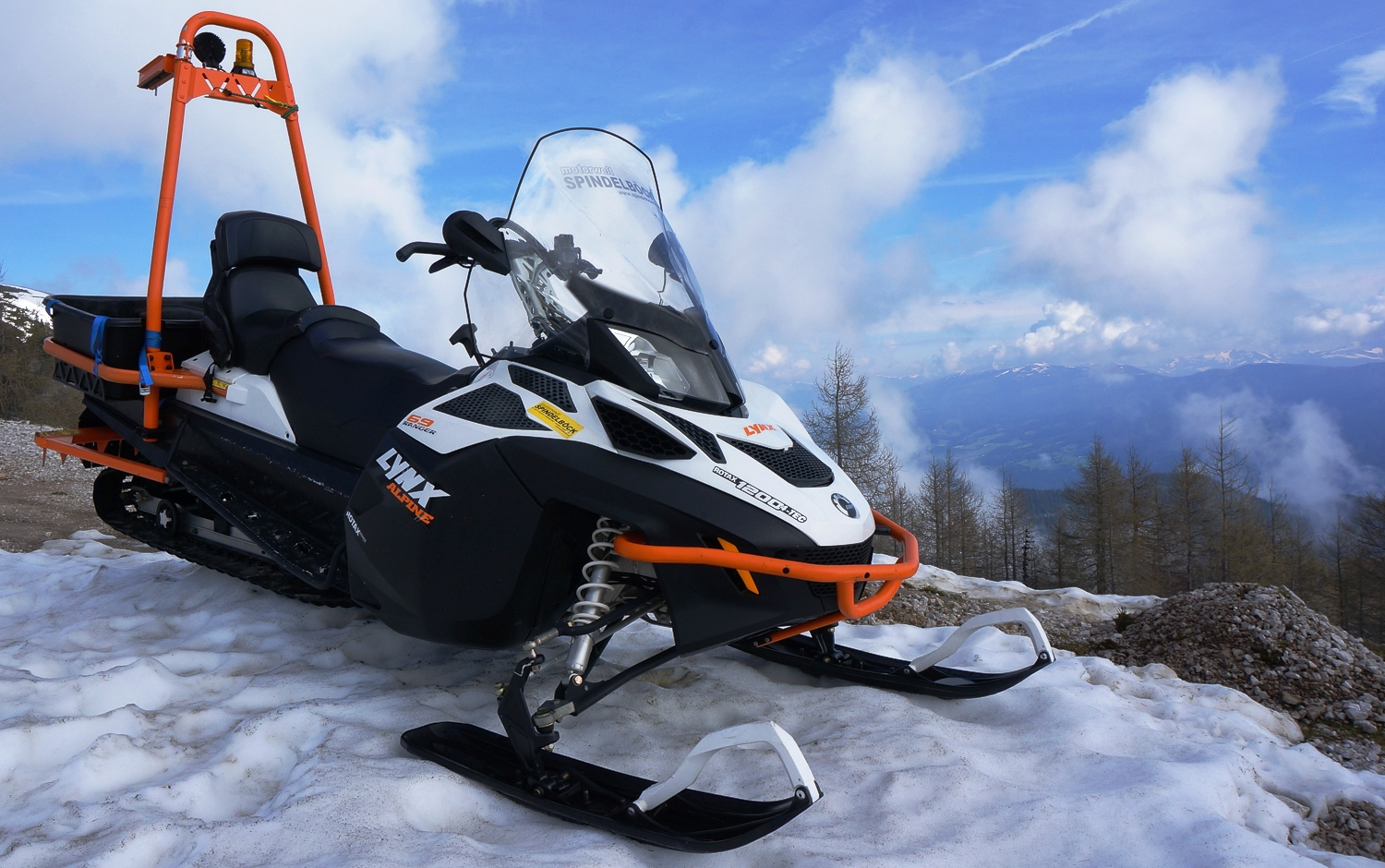
Lynx 69 Ranger Alpine 1200 4-TEC

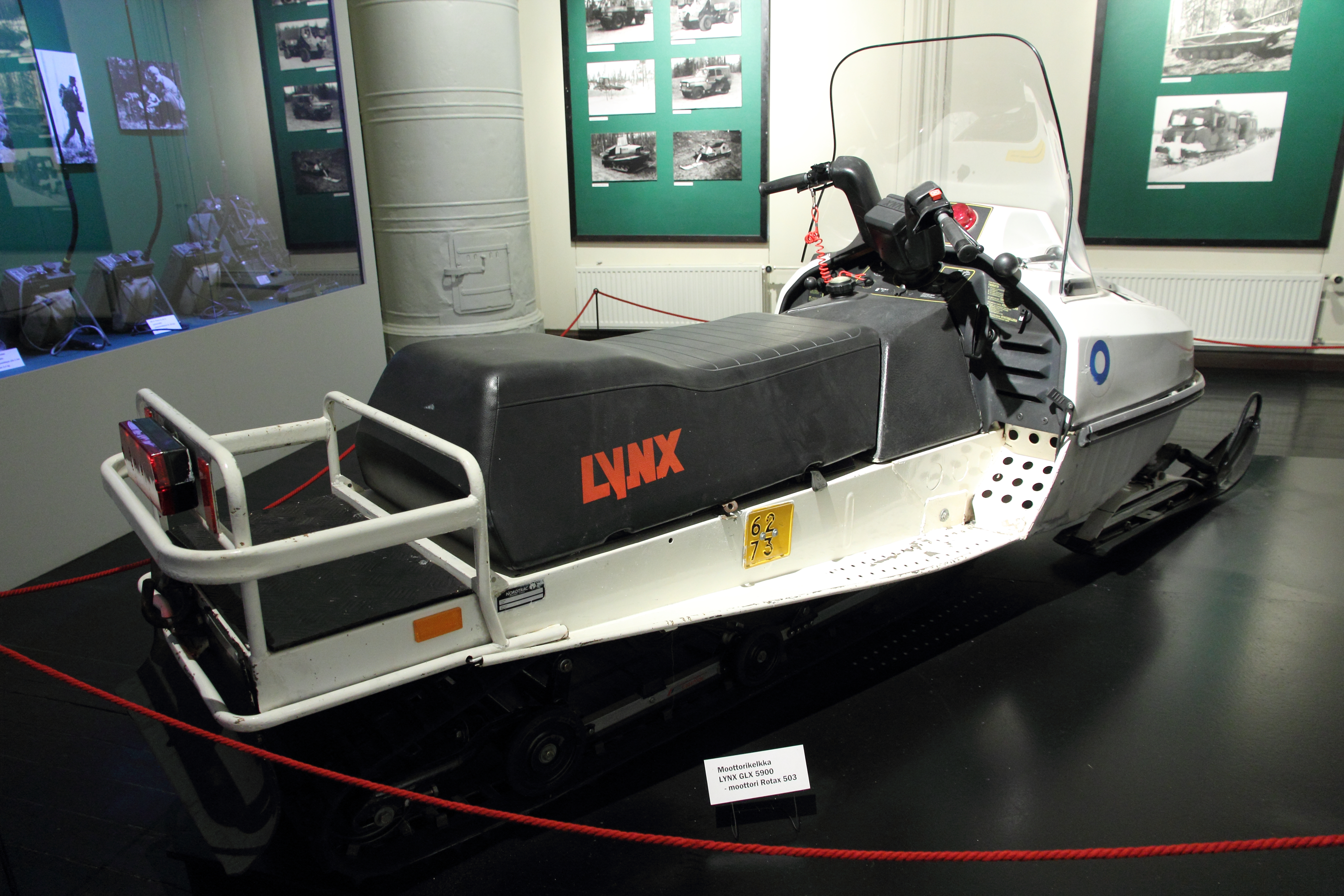
Lynx GLX 5900 snowmobile

Lynx is a Finnish snowmobile brand, manufactured and distributed by Bombardier Recreational Products (BRP), which has made many unique inventions in snowmobile technology. Lynx is a part of a Canadian company BRP. The first Lynx snowmobile was introduced by the Finnish company Velsa Oy in Kurikka in 1968. The newest Lynx snowmobiles are built on Ski-Doo platform with minor differences, but they use a different rear suspension called PPS (Pauli Piippola Suspension) made for rougher conditions than a traditional Ski-Doo suspension system, which is not as tough or heavy as the PPS system.

Lynx snowmobiles feature the Bombardier Recreational Products Rotax engine. This engine design is also used in Ski-Doo brand snowmobiles.

The Lynx lineup features four different categories of snowmobiles which range in performance and function: Sport, Crossover, Touring, and Utility.

In 2018, Lynx introduced the Radien chassis. The Radien chassis is also based on the Ski-Doo chassis, but it is made shorter, lighter and smaller. The weight center is also improved on the Radien chassis.
