= BRP Inc. =

Canadian manufacturer of recreational vehicles

- Type: Public
- Traded as: TSX: DOO; Nasdaq: DOO
- Industry: Automotive
- Founded: 2003; 23 years ago
- Headquarters: Valcourt, Quebec, Canada
- Area served: Worldwide
- Key people: José Boisjoli (President and CEO) Denis Le Vot (President and CEO) as of February 1st, 2026; Laurent Beaudoin (Chair)
- Products: Can-Am; Evinrude; Lynx; Rotax; Sea-Doo; Ski-Doo
- Revenue: 7.903 billions $ US (2025)
- Operating income: 1.057 billions $ US (2025)
- Net income: 745 millions $ US (2025)
- Total assets: 9.09 billions $ US (2025)
- Total equity: 6.55 billions $ (2025)
- Owners: Bombardier-Beaudoin family; Bain Capital; Caisse de dépôt et placement du Québec
- Number of employees: 16 330 employees (2025)
- Website: www.brp.com
- Footnotes; Financials as of fiscal year ended January 31, 2024. References

BRP Inc. (an abbreviation of Bombardier Recreational Products) is a Canadian manufacturer of snowmobiles, all-terrain vehicles, side by sides, motorcycles, and personal watercraft. It was founded in 2003, when the Recreational Products Division of Bombardier Inc. was spun off and sold to a group of investors consisting of Bain Capital, the Bombardier-Beaudoin family and the Caisse de dépôt et placement du Québec. Bombardier Inc., was founded in 1942 as L'Auto-Neige Bombardier Limitée (Bombardier Snowmobile Limited) by Joseph-Armand Bombardier at Valcourt in the Eastern Townships, Quebec.

As of October 6, 2009, BRP had about 5,500 employees; its revenues in 2007 were above US$2.5 billion. BRP has manufacturing facilities in Canada, the United States (Wisconsin, Illinois, North Carolina, Arkansas, Michigan and Minnesota), Mexico, Finland, and Austria. The company's products are sold in more than 100 countries, some of which have their own direct-sales network.

BRP's products include the Ski-Doo and Lynx snowmobiles, Can-Am ATVs and Can-Am motorcycles, Sea-Doo personal watercraft, and Rotax engines. The Ski-Doo was ranked 17th place on CBC Television's The Greatest Canadian Invention in 2007.

== History ==
In January 1934, a blizzard prevented Joseph-Armand Bombardier from reaching the nearest hospital in time to save his two-year-old son, Yvon, who died from appendicitis complicated by peritonitis.

Bombardier was a mechanic who dreamed of building a vehicle that could "float on snow". In 1935, in a repair shop in Valcourt, Quebec, he designed and produced the first snowmobile using a drive system he developed that revolutionized travel in snow and swampy conditions.

In 1937, he patented and sold 12 of the 7-passenger "B7" snow coaches. They were used in rural Quebec to take children to school, carry freight, deliver mail, and as ambulances. In 1941, Bombardier opened a factory in Valcourt.

In 1942, L'Auto-Neige Bombardier Limitée ("Bombardier Snow Car Limited") was founded in Valcourt.

During World War II, the Government of Canada issued wartime rationing regulations. Bombardier customers had to prove that snowmobiles were essential to their livelihood in order to buy one. The company then shifted its focus to the arms industry.

In 1947, during a blizzard in Saskatchewan, the company received positive press coverage when army snowmobiles resupplied isolated radio communication towers.

In 1948, the Government of Quebec passed a law requiring all roads to be cleared of snow; Bombardier's sales fell by nearly half in one year. Armand Bombardier therefore decided to diversify his business, first by producing tracked snowplows sized for use on municipal sidewalks, replacing horse-drawn vehicles, then by making all-terrain vehicles for the mining, petroleum, and forestry industries.

The machines had removable front skis that could be replaced with front wheels for use on paved or hard surfaces, thus providing greater utility to his large snowmobiles. In 1951, the wooden bodies were replaced with sheet steel, and these vehicles were powered by Chrysler flathead six-cylinder engines and 3-speed manual transmissions.

In the early 1950s, Bombardier focused on developing a snowmobile for one or two passengers. A breakthrough occurred in 1957 when Bombardier developed a one-piece molded rubber continuous track with enough durability to provide snow-gripping traction for lightweight vehicles. The vehicle was called the "Ski-Dog" because it was meant to replace the dog sled for hunters and trappers. However, in 1958, "Ski-Doo" was accidentally painted on the first prototype, and immediately became the popular name.

The public soon discovered the fun of speedy vehicles zooming over snow, and a new winter sport was born, centered in Quebec. In the first year, Bombardier sold 225 Ski-Doos; four years later, 8,210 were sold. Bombardier slowed promotion of the Ski-Doo line to prevent it from crowding out other company products, while still dominating the snowmobile industry against competitors Polaris Industries and Arctic Cat.

In 1963, Roski was created in Roxton Falls, Quebec as a manufacturer of composite parts for the Ski-Doo. In the 1960s, V-8 engines were added.

On February 18, 1964, J. Armand Bombardier died of cancer at age 56. Until then, he oversaw all areas of operation and controlled the research department, making all the drawings himself. The younger generation took over, led by Armand's sons and sons-in-law, reorganizing and decentralizing the company. The company adopted computer inventory, accounting, and billing. Distribution networks were improved and increased, and an incentive program was developed for sales staff. That year, a survey was mailed to Ski-Doo owners to find out how the product was being used. Germain Bombardier, who had been groomed by his father, took over the company upon his father's death in 1964. He quit and sold his shares in 1966 after a disagreement with other family members. Laurent Beaudoin, the son-in-law of the founder, then became president, a position he held until 1999.

In 1967, the company was renamed Bombardier Limited. By that time, the snowmobiles were very useful for the Inuit.

In 1968, Clayton Jacobson II invented the jet ski and the company licensed his patents to create the Sea-Doo personal watercraft.

On January 23, 1969, the company became a public company, listing on the Montreal Exchange and the Toronto Stock Exchange.

In 1969–1970, the standard round windows reminiscent of portholes were replaced with larger rectangular windows that provided more interior light. A change was made to the Chrysler Industrial 318 engines with the automatic Loadflite transmissions.

In 1970, the company acquired Rotax, an engine manufacturer based in Gunskirchen, Austria.

In 1971, Bombardier acquired Moto-Ski. Also in 1971, Bombardier launched Operation SnoPlan, a program to promote snowmobile safety after a mounting death toll due to snowmobile accidents.

In the 1970s, the company began producing Can-Am motorcycles, which included Rotax engines.

By 1990, the first product of the company, the Ski-Doo snowmobile, had become its weakest part, producing deficits and high inventories.

In 2001 Bombardier purchased the Evinrude Outboard Motors and Johnson Outboards trade names for the insolvent Outboard Marine Corporation.

In 2003, the company sold Bombardier Recreational Products to a group of investors: Bain Capital (50%), Bombardier Family (35%) and Caisse de dépôt et placement du Québec (15%) for $875 million.

In May 2025, José Boisjoli announced that he would be retiring before the end of the year. In December 2025, it was announced that Denis Le Vot would be succeeding José Boisjoli as President and Chief Executive Officer.

== Snowmobiles ==
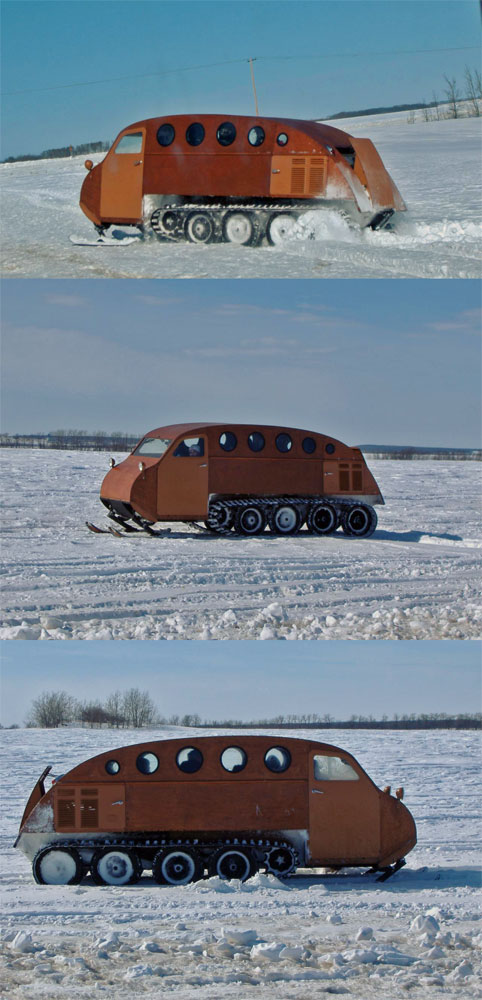
A 1949 Bombardier B12

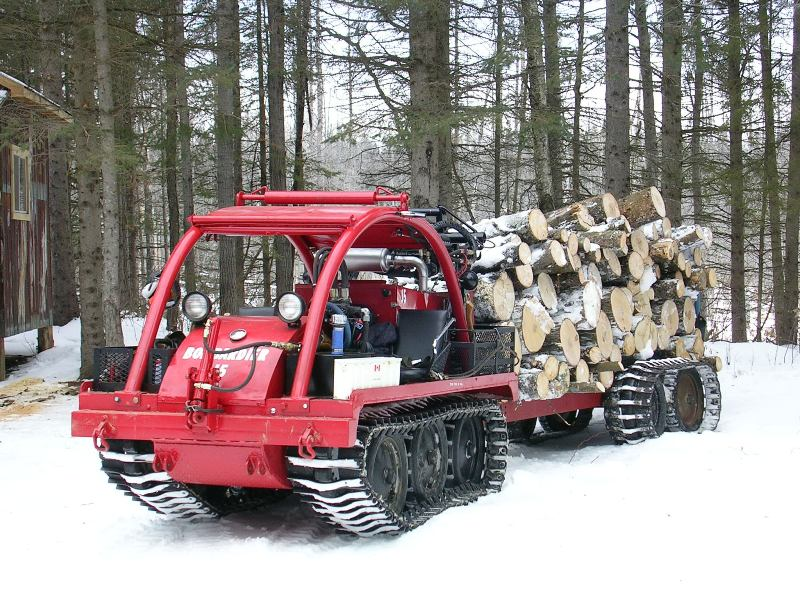
A J5 tractor and trailer, capable of snow or muskeg use

Before the start of the company's development of track vehicles, Joseph-Armand Bombardier experimented with propeller-driven aerosleds. His work with snowplane designs can be traced to before 1920. He quickly abandoned his efforts to develop a snowplane and turned his inventive skills to tracked vehicles.

From the start, the company made truck-sized half-track vehicles, with skis in the front and caterpillar tracks in the rear, designed for the worst winter conditions of the flatland Canadian countryside. After producing half-tracks in World War II for the Canadian Army, the company experimented with new forms of track systems and developed an all-tracked, heavy duty vehicle designed for logging and mining operations in extreme wilderness conditions, such as heavy snow or semiliquid muskeg. They produced it under the name Muskeg tractor.

Each track is composed of two or more rubber belts joined into a loop. The loops are held together with interior wheel guides and exterior cleats, commonly called grousers. The tracks are driven by a large drive sprocket that engages the grousers in sequence and causes the track to rotate. Two belt tracks were common on early model Bombardiers and muskeg machines. For deep-snow use, wider tracks, employing additional belts, are used for added flotation over the snow.

The research for the track base made it possible to produce a small, continuous-rubber track for the light one- or two-person snowmobile the founder of the company had dreamed about during his teen years. This led to the invention of snowmobiles.

The company created the snowmobile market, and held its own after international competitors entered the market in the late 1960s. From the 1940s through the early 1970s, Bombardier built the most successful snowcat models ever produced by any snowcat manufacturer. The B12 seated 12 people, and the C18 seated 18. Both were similar in design with long tracks in the rear and skis used to steer the vehicle. The B12 and C18 were very fast for their day, with speeds over the snow exceeding 30 miles per hour. Most historic and most modern snowcats have a top speed of barely 20 mph. The Bombardier B12 and C18 were probably the precursors to the more modern snow coach used by resorts for transporting tourists. In their day, the B12 and C18 vehicles were used as school buses, mail delivery and emergency vehicles in northern United States and Canada, and were best suited to flat land conditions, frozen roadways, or frozen lakes. While more than 3,000 of the Bombardier B12/C18 variants were produced, Bombardier had competitors in both the North American and world markets. Most of the Bombardier production stayed in North American. The front ski design was incapable of being used in deep snow and rough ground conditions, which opened the door for the development of dual-track and quad-track snowcats. Unfortunately, the front ski design was not easily adapted to change for other ground conditions, so while it was successful on flat lands, frozen lakes, and snow-covered roads, it could not compete on rough, off-road conditions. The combination of the lack of design flexibility, incompatibility with off-road conditions, and the advent of modern snowplowing practices of public roadways beginning in the 1950s, and becoming common in remote areas by the 1960s, probably led to the demise of the B12/C18 design. Today, B12s are still in used in large-scale ice fishing in northern Canada.

Notable competitors included the Aktiv Snow Trac ST4 from Sweden, Thiokol, and Tucker Sno-Cat from the USA. The Snow Trac was produced, virtually unchanged, until 1981, but it was successful, with over 2,000 units sold, and it was used all over the globe for exploration and commercial purposes, as well as the 1972 Winter Olympics in Sapporo, Japan. Tucker Sno-Cat grew to become one of the world's largest builders of these vehicles, and produces a range of large commercial and exploration vehicles from its location in Medford, Oregon, USA. Thiokol produced popular units, notably the Imp, Super Imp, and Spryte models, but changed ownership and name several times before going out of business in 2000 as the Logan Machine Company and manufacturer of the LMC brand.

== Development of the small snowmobile ==
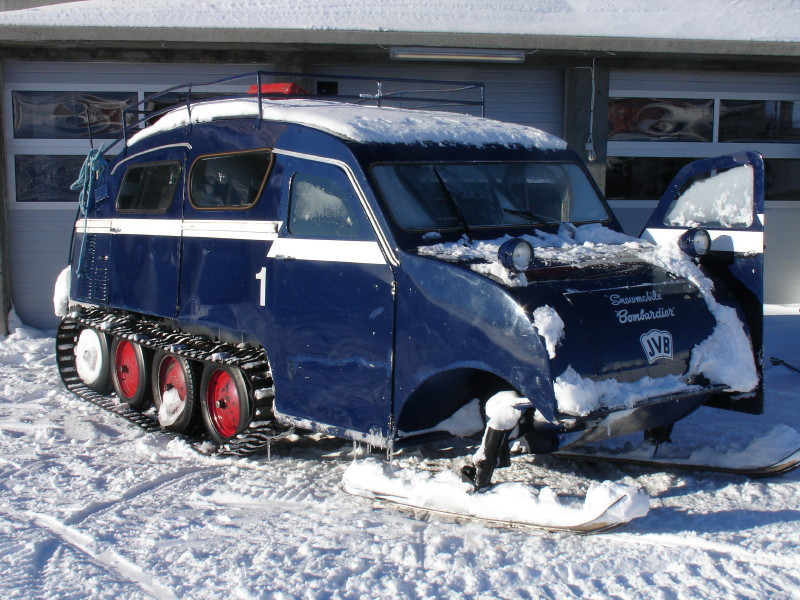
Exterior of a steel bodied R64 operated by JVB between Tyin and Eidsbugarden.

Armand dreamed of developing a fast, lightweight snowmobile that could carry one or two people. In the early 1950s, Armand set aside his dream to focus on developing his company's other tracked vehicles. But by the end of the decade, smaller, more efficient engines had been developed and were starting to come on the market. Armand resumed his efforts to build a "miniature" snowmobile. He worked alongside his eldest son Germain, who shared his father's mechanical talents. Armand and Germain developed several prototypes of the lightweight snowmobile and finally, the first Bombardier snowmobile went on sale in 1959.

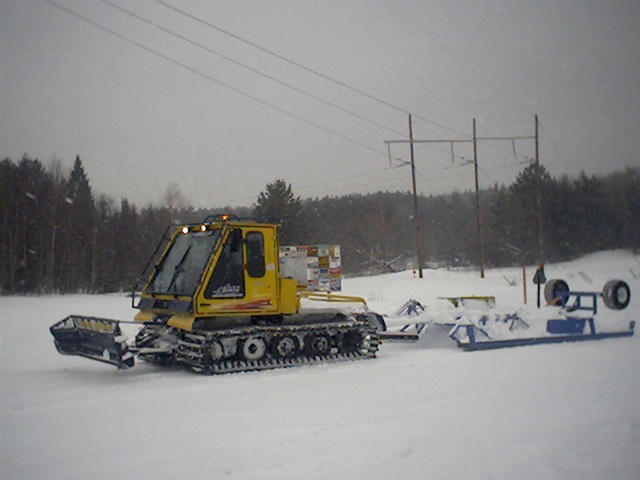
Bombardier BR180 snowcat pulling snowmobile trail groomer attachment

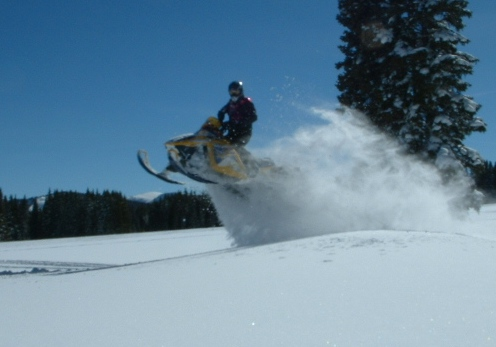
Jumping with a Ski-Doo XRS 800

The Ski-Doo was intended to be named the "Ski-Dog" because Bombardier meant it to be a practical vehicle to replace the dogsled for hunters and trappers. By accident, a printer misinterpreted the name and printed "Ski-Doo" in the first sales brochure. Public interest in the small snowmobiles grew quickly. Suddenly a new winter sport was born, centred in Quebec. In the first year, Bombardier sold 225 Ski-Doos; four years later, 8,210 were sold. But Armand was reluctant to focus too much on the Ski-Doo and move resources away from his all-terrain vehicles. Armand slowed down promotion of the Ski-Doo line to prevent it from dominating the other company products but still dominate the entire snowmobile industry. The snowmobiles produced earned a better reputation than the rival Polaris and Arctic Cat brands of motor sleds. In 1971, Bombardier completed the purchase of the Moto-Ski company to expand the Ski-Doo line and eliminate a competitor from the marketplace.

In the mid 1990s, some of the sleds made by Ski-Doo were the Formula III, Mach 1, and Mach Z with Rotax engines. While it is a commonly held misconception that all Ski-Doo snowmobiles were powered by rotary valved engines, this is not true. Only two cylinder Rotax engines were equipped with rotary valves. As a rule, the later rotary valved sleds were liquid cooled as well. Fan cooled sleds were usually piston port (2-stroke) induction. Sleds such as the formula III, later model mach-1's and the mach Z were powered by three cylinder, 2-stroke, Rotax engines. In 1994 the company produced the first snowmobile equipped specifically for mountain riding, the Ski-Doo Summit. Ski-Doo snowmobiles have been competitive for performance and in the marketplace, taking national titles in racing events from Sno-X to hill-climbing. In 1999 Ski-Doo introduced the ZX aluminum chassis which was lighter weight with better suspension and thus successful in sno-cross competition. In 2003 Ski-Doo introduced rider-forward REV chassis, which changed the sport and was followed by other manufacturers. In 2008 Ski-Doo introduced the XP chassis, which moved the rider further forward with major weight reduction. The XP was the lightest machine available, with power-to-weight ratios in the Summit models for the first time under 3 lb per HP.

For the 2017 snow year, Ski-Doo will release its most powerful engine. The Rotax 850 cc "Etec" engine. The engine produces 10 more horsepower (170 hp) than its predecessor, it is also more efficient 40 percent less oil burn than the previous Etec. and 30 percent quicker throttle response; this engine paired with the new SP chassis which moves the rider even further forward and provides a big weight reduction over the XP chassis. This makes the 2017 the most capable snowmobile ever, reaching speed of upwards of 120 mph in the MXZ models.

== Motorcycles and ATVs ==
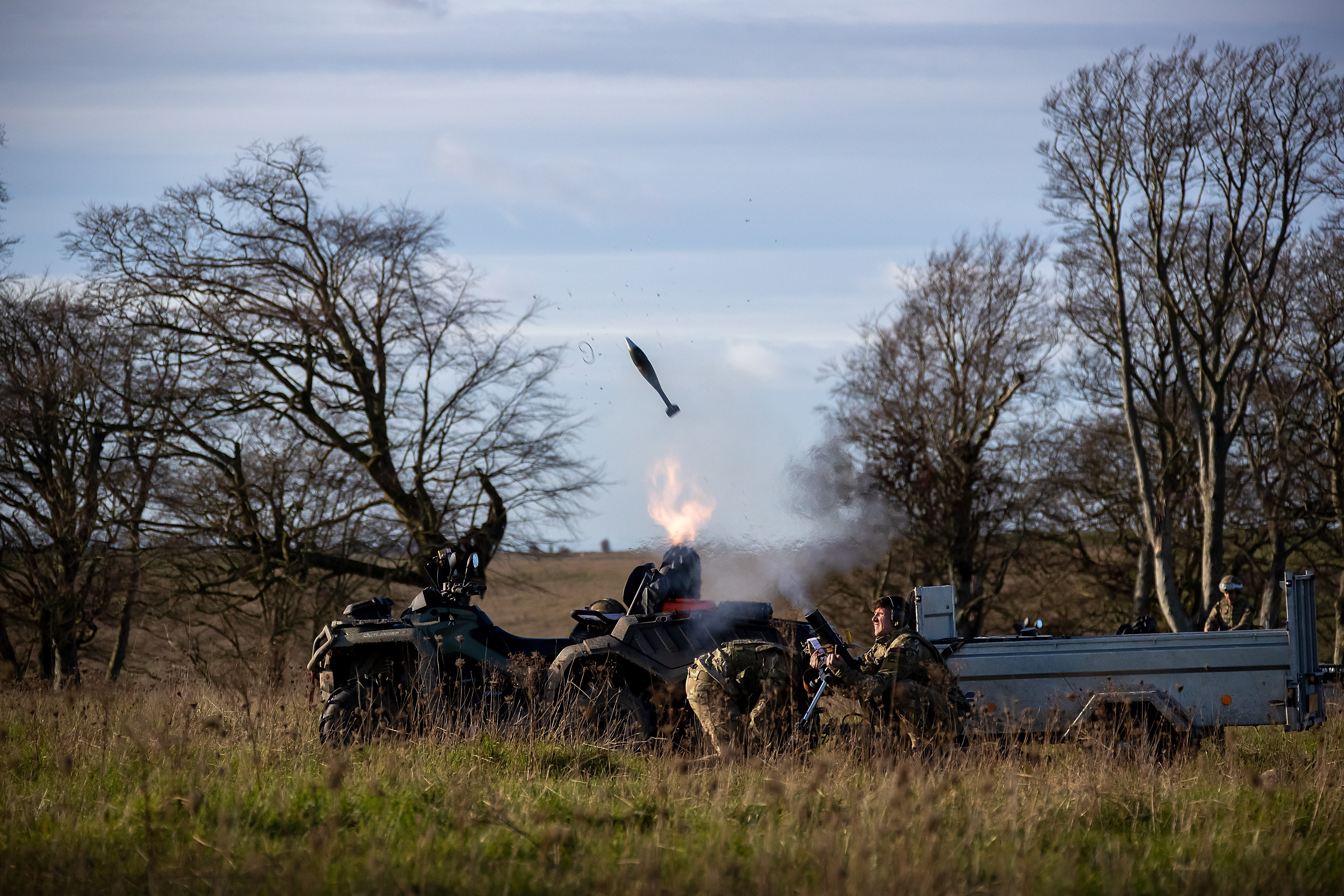
Royal Marines trialling mortars fired from a Can-Am Outlander in 2020

During the 1970s, Bombardier built the Can-Am brand of off-road competition motorcycles designed for motocross and enduro with Rotax engines displacing 125, 175, 248, 366, 500 and 800 cc. The bikes competed successfully in professional racing with Gary Jones winning the 1974 US 250cc AMA motocross national championship. In 1983, Bombardier licensed the brand and outsourced development and production of the Can-Am motorcycles to Armstrong-CCM Motorcycles of Lancashire, England. 1987 was the last model year for Can-Am.

In 2007 Bombardier renamed their all-terrain vehicle line of products Can-Am. Can-am Off-Road has seven models of ATVs, the Outlander, the Renegade, the Commander, The Maverick, the DS, the Traxter, the Quest, and the Rally.

The Traxter and Quest (no longer in production) had two engine sizes 500cc and 650cc. The Rally (also no longer in production) was available with a 200cc engine. The Outlander is a utility style ATV available in multiple engine sizes, including 400cc and 450cc single cylinder and 500cc, 570cc, 650cc, 800cc, 850cc and 1000cc V-Twin engines. The Outlander MAX is available for 2-up riding and the Outlander X-MR is built specifically for mud riding. The Renegade is also available with multiple engine choices, a 500cc, 570cc, 800cc, 850cc or 1000cc V-Twin engine. The Renegade X-XC is a separate trim level built specifically for cross country racing. The Outlander 800R X-XC is a version of the Renegade with the same trim level for cross country racing and non-racing trail riding.

The XT-P is the modern outlander XXC and features the XT package with front sway bar and beadlock wheels. The 1000cc engine was introduced into the quad classification in the 2012 model year for both the Outlander and the Renegade series. The DS has four engine choices, a 450cc, 250cc, 90cc and 70cc. A 650cc engine was once available but has since been discontinued. An "X" trim level is available for the DS-450 and the DS-90. The Commander is a SSV or Side by side introduced for 2010 with either 800cc or 1000cc engines.

Commander has several trim levels, including XT, X and LTD (Limited) at the time the only engine option for the extra packages was the 1000. The XT had upgraded wheels, winch, front bumper and upgraded gauge and steering wheel. The X package had Bumpers, rock sliders, XT gauge and steering wheel, X package seats, and beadlock wheels. Commander Limited includes air ride suspension, an am/fm radio with four speakers, an iPod adapter, XT package and built-in touch screen GPS. All Can Am ATVs except the DS-70 and the DS-90 feature four-stroke Rotax engines. The maverick side by side was introduced to stand up to the Commander's rival the Polaris RZR XP 900.

The Maverick has an updated version of the commander's 1000cc V-Twin Rotax engine (1000R) this engine had a massive 101 horsepower. This was achieved by using high flow dynamics to increase exhaust and air flow. The Maverick comes in six packages (at February 2014) Base, XRS, XRS DPS, XMR, X ds, and X ds Turbo. In the X ds lineup Can Am brought the first factory installed turbocharged engine to the industry. The turbo boosts the horsepower of the Maverick from 101 horsepower to 121 horsepower.

== Invention of the three-wheeled roadster ==
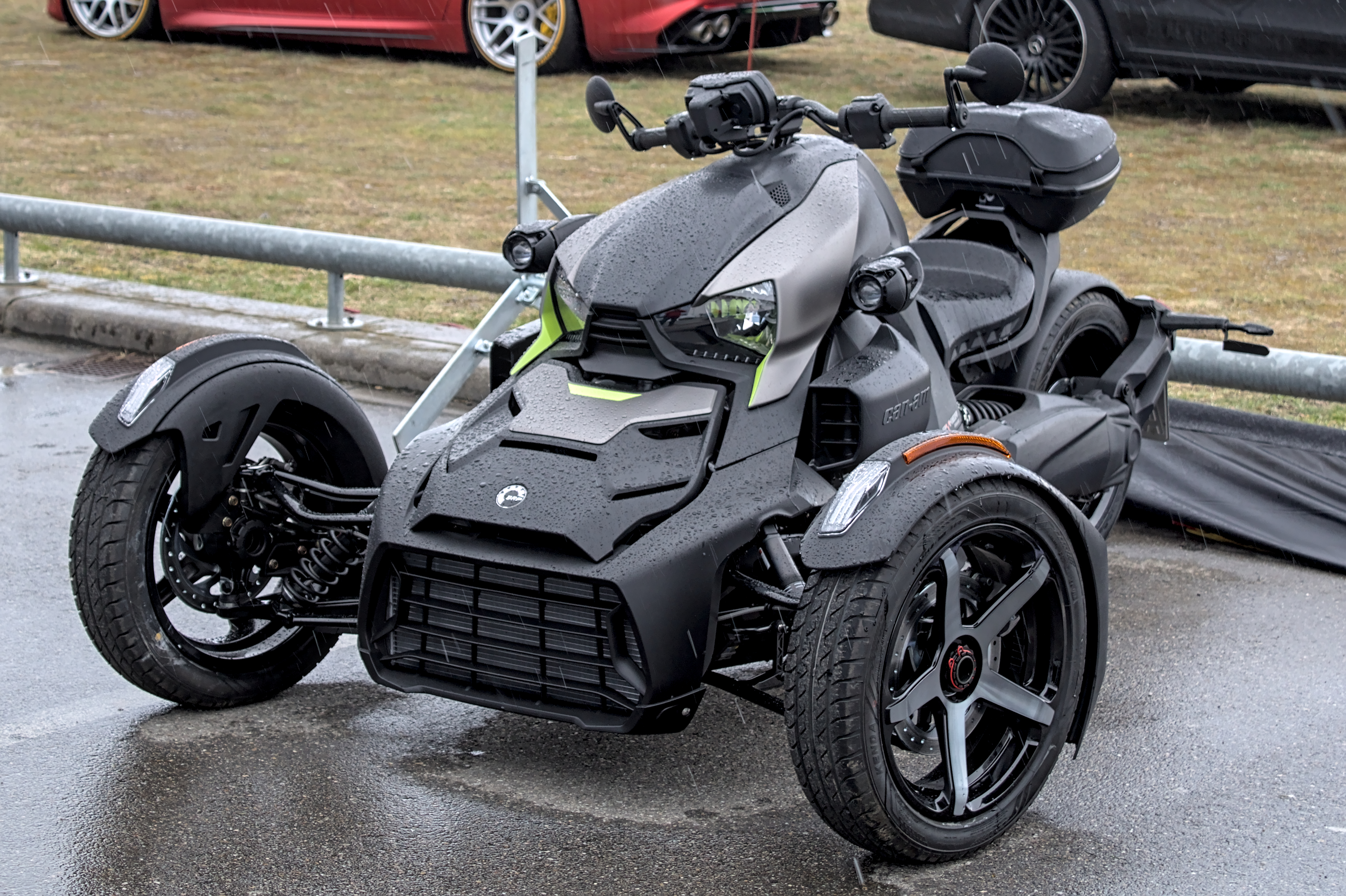
Can-Am Ryker

In 2007, BRP announced the launch of a new three-wheeled roadster called the Spyder, which was released in Q4 2007 under the Can-Am brand. This is the first vehicle from BRP to go on the road. It was described as part motorcycle and part roadster; the latter is how the company refers to it. The Guinness World Record for the “Largest Parade of Can-Am Spyder Roadsters” was established in 2010 when 438 Can-Am Spyders paraded around Magog, Quebec. In 2018, the Can-Am Ryker was launched as a simpler, more easygoing counterpart to the Spyder.

== Sailboats ==
Beginning in the 1970s, Bombardier also built several sailboat models, including the Invitation sailboat, with hull length of 15 ft 7 in (4.7 m); the Bombardier 3.8, with hull length of 12 ft 6 in (3.8 m); the Bombardier 4.8 and the Bombardier 7.6 keelboat.

== Diversification ==
In the 1970s and 1980s, the company diversified into railway and aeronautical products and became a multinational corporation known as Bombardier Inc.

== Restructuring ==
During restructuring operations in 2003, the original snowmobile and tracked utility vehicle division was spun off as a separate company, with majority ownership transferred to Bain Capital. Though the company is a major manufacturer of two stroke engines and four stroke motors for several industries it is better known for its consumer recreational products.

They now make Ski-Doo and Lynx brand snowmobiles, all-terrain vehicles, Sea-Doo personal water craft, jet boats, and Evinrude outboard motors (through the purchase of Outboard Marine Corporation). Bombardier Recreational Products no longer sells outboards under the Johnson brand since 2007, as they have moved all sales entirely to Evinrude Outboard Motors. They support existing Johnson outboard motors through servicing and parts. They also produce motorcycle motors, kart motors, and small airplane motors, through their Rotax division.

In December 2004, Bombardier Recreational Products Inc, sold the industrial vehicles division to the Camoplast of Sherbrooke, Quebec. The industrial vehicles division made tracked vehicles such as snowcats, sidewalk snow removal tractors, and Tracked Utility Vehicles, including the descendant of their original Muskeg tractor.

In October 2007, Bombardier Recreational Products Inc. ordered at least some U.S. ATV dealerships to stop selling vehicles to Canadian customers, as the sales were a violation of dealer agreements to respect assigned geographic boundaries. Bombardier also announced that the warranty on any craft purchased by a Canadian in the United States – even if the purchase was initially made by an American - would be void. Newspaper articles revealed that some models were being sold in Canada for as much as 40% above prices in the U.S.

In September 2012, the company announced that it would exit the sport boat business citing a decline in global sales in the marine industry. This meant the loss of 350 jobs, including most of those at a plant in Benton, Illinois.

On May 29, 2013, the company announced the closing of an initial public offering of 12,200,000 subordinate voting shares of the company at a price of $21.50 per share resulting in gross proceeds to the company of approximately $262,300,000. The net proceeds from the offering were used to repay outstanding loans. The company's shares now trade on the Toronto Stock Exchange.

On May 27, 2020, the company announced the discontinuation of its Evinrude E-TEC and E-TEC G2 outboard engines, the repurposing of its Sturtevant, WI, facility, and the closing of its Alumacraft operations in Arkadelphia, AR. The company stated that it had signed an agreement with Mercury Marine to support boat packages and continue to supply outboard engines to BRP boat brands.

== Bombardier Museum ==
The Museum of Ingenuity J. Armand Bombardier is a museum in Valcourt, Quebec dedicated to the life of Joseph-Armand Bombardier and the snowmobile industry. Opened in 1971, with renovations in 1990, the museum is professionally curated and features Ski-Doos, other industrial designs, and a selection of books, booklets and other items of interest to snowmobile enthusiasts.

The museum includes the original garage "factory" where the first snowmobile was built. The garage was removed from its original location in Valcourt and moved to its site at the museum, which is located blocks away from the Bombardier Recreational Products factory.

== See also ==
- Continuous track
- Half-track
- John Deere Buck (produced by Bombardier)
- List of Bombardier recreational and snow vehicles
- Roski, a former division
- Rotax
