= Laurent Beaudoin =

Canadian businessman from Quebec

- Born: May 13, 1938 (age 88); Laurier-Station, Quebec, Canada
- Occupation: Businessman
- Known for: Chair of the board of Bombardier Inc.
- Spouse: Claire Bombardier
- Awards: Order of Canada; National Order of Quebec

Laurent Robert Beaudoin CC OQ CMG (French pronunciation: [loʁɑ̃ ʁɔbɛʁ bodwɛ̃]; born May 13, 1938) is a Canadian businessman from Quebec. From 1979 to 2003, he was the CEO of the transportation company Bombardier.

== Early life ==
Beaudoin was born in Laurier Station, Quebec. In 1959, while studying accounting at the University of Sherbrooke, he married Claire Bombardier, daughter of Canadian businessman Joseph Armand Bombardier.

== Career ==
Beaudoin began his career in 1961 in Sherbrooke, Quebec by founding a firm of chartered accountants, Beaudoin and Blais, soon followed by a second firm, Beaudoin, Morin, Dufresne & Associés. In 1963 he joined the family business, L’Auto-Neige Bombardier Limited, as comptroller. He was named president of the company in 1966, shortly after Bombardier's death. He became chairman and chief executive officer of Bombardier Inc. in 1979. Under his leadership, the company grew from a snowmobile manufacturer to the world's largest manufacturer of rail transportation equipment and to the world's third largest civil aircraft maker.

After taking the company's helm, Beaudoin took it public, then during the 1970s used the funds thus raised to grow Bombardier into a large rail transportation company. In 1986 he oversaw Bombardier's entry into the aviation field through acquiring the assets of Canadair, which had been manufacturing Challenger business jets and amphibious aircraft. He led the acquisition of other cash-starved companies; by 1992 he controlled Short Brothers, Learjet, and de Havilland.

In June 2000, Beaudoin was named a member of the advisory board of Lazard Canada.

Paul Tellier, CEO of Bombardier Inc. resigned as CEO and a director on December 13, 2004. Non-management independent directors Michael McCain and Mrs. Jalynn Bennett also resigned as directors of Bombardier Inc. at the same time.

A new Office of the President was then established with Executive Chairman Laurent Beaudoin as chair. His son, Pierre Beaudoin, then President and Chief Operating Officer of Bombardier Aerospace, became a member of the Office of the President and was appointed a director of Bombardier Inc.

In 2018 Beaudoin retired from Bombardier after 55 years.

== Honours and recognition ==

Ribbon	Description	Notes
	Companion of the Order of Canada (C.C.)	Awarded on: November 17, 1988; Invested on: April 12, 1989
	Officer of the Order of Canada (O.C.)	Awarded on: June 19, 1973; Invested on: August 2, 1973
	Officer of the National Order of Quebec (O.Q..)	
	Queen Elizabeth II Silver Jubilee Medal for Canada	1977; As an officer of the Order of Canada, monsieur Beaudoin is awarded with Queen Elizabeth II Silver Jubilee Medal]
	125th Anniversary of the Confederation of Canada Medal	1993; As an officer of the Order of Canada, monsieur Beaudoin is awarded with the 125th Anniversary of the Confederation of Canada Medal
	Queen Elizabeth II Golden Jubilee Medal for Canada	2002; As an officer of the Order of Canada, monsieur Beaudoin is awarded with Queen Elizabeth II Golden Jubilee Medal; Canadian version
	Queen Elizabeth II Diamond Jubilee Medal for Canada	2012; As an officer of the Order of Canada, monsieur Beaudoin is awarded with Queen Elizabeth II Golden Jubilee Medal; Canadian version
	Companion of the Most Distinguished Order of Saint Michael and Saint George	2013

In 1973 Beaudoin was named Officer of the Order of Canada. In 1989 he was named a Fellow of the Ordre des comptables agréés du Québec, and also Companion of the Order of Canada. The next year he became and Officer of the National Order of Quebec.

In 2000 Beaudoin was named one of the great Quebecers of the century by the Académie des Grands Québécois.

In 2008 he was presented with the International Michael Smurfit Business Achievement Award' by the Ireland Chamber, United States, and also received the Best Global Business Award from the Canada China Business Council in Beijing. The next year he was presented with the Grosse silberne ehrenzeichen mit dem stern by the President of the Republic of Austria.

In 2013 Beaudoin became a Companion of the Most Distinguished Order of St Michael and St George, for services to British industry, particularly in Northern Ireland. The next year he was presented with the Philip J. Klass Award for Lifetime Achievement by Aviation Week & Space Technology magazine

== Honorary doctorates ==
Beoudoin has received honorary doctorates from the Université de Montréal, York University, Université de Sherbrooke, Université Sainte-Anne, Bishop's University, Queen's University, Belfast (Northern Ireland), University of Toronto, Carleton University, McGill University and Concordia University.
