= Joseph-Armand Bombardier =

Canadian inventor and businessman (1907–1964)

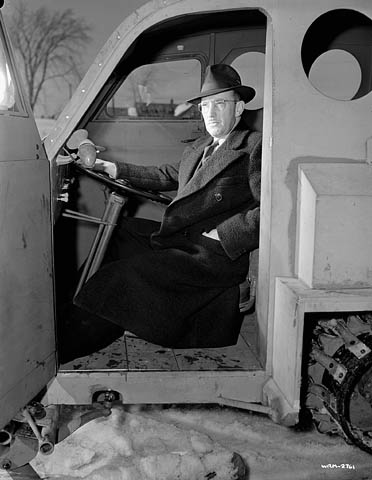
- Bombardier in his B-12 snowbus
- Born: April 16, 1907; Valcourt, Quebec, Canada
- Died: February 18, 1964 (aged 56); Sherbrooke, Quebec, Canada
- Known for: Founder of Bombardier
- Spouse: Yvonne Labrecque (m. 1929)
- Children: 6
- Relatives: Laurent Beaudoin (son-in-law)

Joseph-Armand Bombardier (French: [ʒozɛf aʁmɑ̃ bɔ̃baʁdje]; April 16, 1907 – February 18, 1964) was a Canadian inventor and businessman who was the founder of Bombardier. His most famous invention was a snowmobile.

== Biography ==
Joseph-Armand Bombardier was born in Valcourt on 16 April 1907, and became the oldest of eight siblings. He dabbled in mechanics from an early age, building various small-scale devices. At age 15, he built his first snow vehicle.

Bombardier attended a seminary for several years before becoming an apprentice at a mechanics shop at age 17. He then moved to Montreal and studying electrical and mechanical engineering. After a couple of years, his father built him a workshop in Valcourt. He acquired experience by reading, taking notes and repairing what he found until he opened his own garage at age 19, where he would repair cars and sell gasoline in the summertime. Meanwhile, Bombardier worked on developing a vehicle able to travel on snow.

Bombardier married Yvonne Labrecque in 1929, and the couple had six children. Unfortunately, their two-year-old son died in January 1934 because they could not adequately commute to the hospital during a blizzard. This strengthened Bombardier's resolve to develop a vehicle that could adequately travel in snow.

By the following years, Bombardier assembled the first snowmobile, which used caterpillar tracks, used skis for steering, and held a couple of people. On June 29, 1937, he patented his sprocket wheel and track drive system, and he was able to sell his B7 (Bombardier, 7 passenger) vehicle that year. After selling to rural medical professionals, sales opened to various industries.

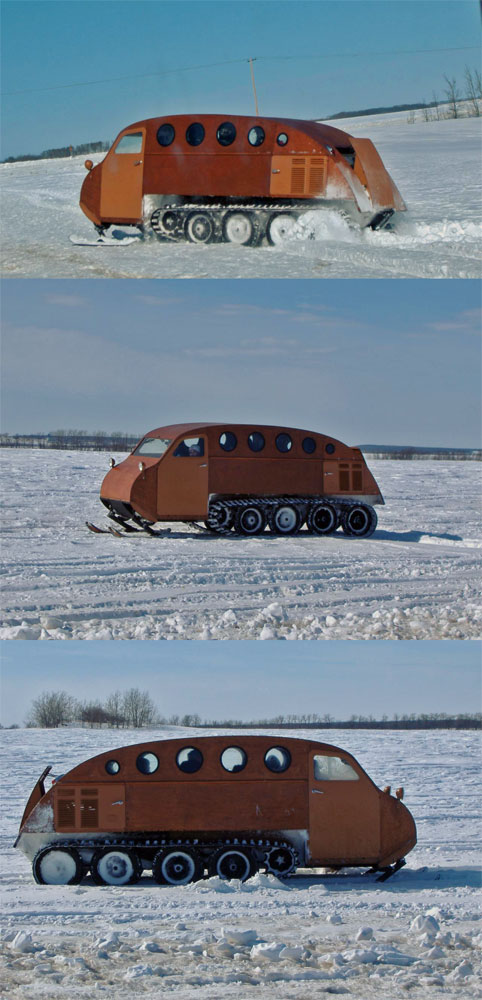
A completely restored Bombardier model B12 snowmobile, manufactured in 1949

A new plant able to produce more than 200 vehicles a year was built in 1940. A new 12-passenger model, named the B12, was made available in 1941, with a patent passing in 1942. After the start of World War II, the Canadian Armed Forces requested a similar but more powerful vehicle, resulting in new models manufactured during the mid-1940s. The company also brought to market a C18, which served the public as a school bus. By 1947, the company was manufacturing 1,000 vehicles annually.

The winter of 1947-48, however, showed business declined due to a lighter winter and changes to policies, wherein governments began clearing more roads. In response, Bombardier began developing all-terrain vehicles, such as the Muskeg, introduced in 1953, that could manage swamp, sand, or snowy groups and benefitted multiple industries.

By the end of the 1950s, Bombardier returned to his original idea of easily travelling across snow. He tested a wooden prototype in 1958 before launching the Ski-Doo, a small snowmobile, in 1959. The vehicle was originally planned to be called Ski-Dog, but a printing accident spelt it as Ski-Doo; Bombardier considered the typo a fortuitous development for a new trademark for his company. The Ski-Doo saw great success initially in Northern communities, with widespread success rising as the vehicle became more available for recreational use. In 2007, CBC Television named the Ski-Doo the seventeenth greatest Canadian invention.

Bombardier died in Sherbrooke on February 18, 1964.

== Honours ==
In 2004, Autoroute 55 in Quebec was named autoroute Joseph-Armand-Bombardier between Stanstead and Autoroute 20 (autoroute Jean-Lesage) near Drummondville. The Bombardier Glacier in Antarctica is also named after him.

In 2000, Joseph-Armand Bombardier was honoured by the government of Canada with his image on a postage stamp.

He is a member of the Canadian Science and Engineering Hall of Fame.

== See also ==
- Bombardier Recreational Products
- Ski-doo
- Roski, a division founded by Joseph-Armand Bombardier
