= Bombardier Inc. =

Canadian aerospace manufacturer

- Type: Public
- Traded as: TSX: BBD.A, BBD.B; S&P/TSX 60 component
- Industry: Aircraft
- Founded: July 10, 1942; 84 years ago in Valcourt, Quebec, Canada
- Founder: Joseph-Armand Bombardier
- Headquarters: Montreal, Quebec, Canada
- Area served: Worldwide
- Key people: Pierre Beaudoin (chair); Éric Martel (president & CEO)
- Revenue: ▲US$9.55 billion (2025)
- Operating income: ▲US$1.559 billion (2025)
- Net income: ▲US$805 millions (2025)
- Total assets: ▲US$12.668 billion (2024)
- Total equity: ▼US$(1.991) billion (2024)
- Number of employees: 18,752 (2025)
- Divisions: Bombardier Defense
- Website: bombardier.com
- Footnotes; Financials as of 31 December 2025. References

Bombardier Inc. (French: [bɔ̃baʁdje]) is a Canadian manufacturer of business jets. Headquartered in Montreal, the company was founded in 1942 in Valcourt by Joseph-Armand Bombardier to market his snowmobiles, later to become one of the world's largest producers of aircraft and trains until divestiture in the 21st century.

During the 1970s and 1980s, the company diversified into public transport vehicles and commercial jets, and it became a multinational corporation. Bombardier grew particularly fast at the end of the 1980s, when the turnover multiplied sixfold within six years. At that time, it was North America's most important producer of railway vehicles, Canada's most important aerospace manufacturer and the worldwide leading snowmobile maker. The growth came mainly from buying failing government-owned companies at a low price and orchestrating a turnaround.

However, the launch of the CSeries aircraft sent Bombardier into deep debt, pushing it to the brink of bankruptcy by 2015. As a result, the company sold nearly all of its operations except business jet manufacturing.

Bombardier manufactures two families of corporate jets, the Global series and the Challenger series. On May 18, 2021, the Global 7500/8000 series during testing became the first business jet to break the sound barrier and the fastest civil aircraft since Concorde. With deliveries of 138 business jets in 2023, Bombardier was the number one manufacturer of business jets in the world.

It has service centers for these in a number of airports around the world, for example, for England, they are based a few miles south of its centre at Biggin Hill.

== Corporate affairs ==
The key trends of Bombardier are (as at the financial year ending December 31):

Year	Revenue (US$ bn)	Net income (US$ m)	Employees	Refs
2018	16.2	318	40,650	
2019	7.4	–1,607	24,350	
2020	6.4	–568	16,000	
2021	6.0	5,070	13,800	
2022	6.9	–148	15,900	
2023	8.0	445	18,100	
2024	8.7	370	18,800	
2025	9.6	928	18,900	

== Divested lines of business ==
=== Commercial aviation ===
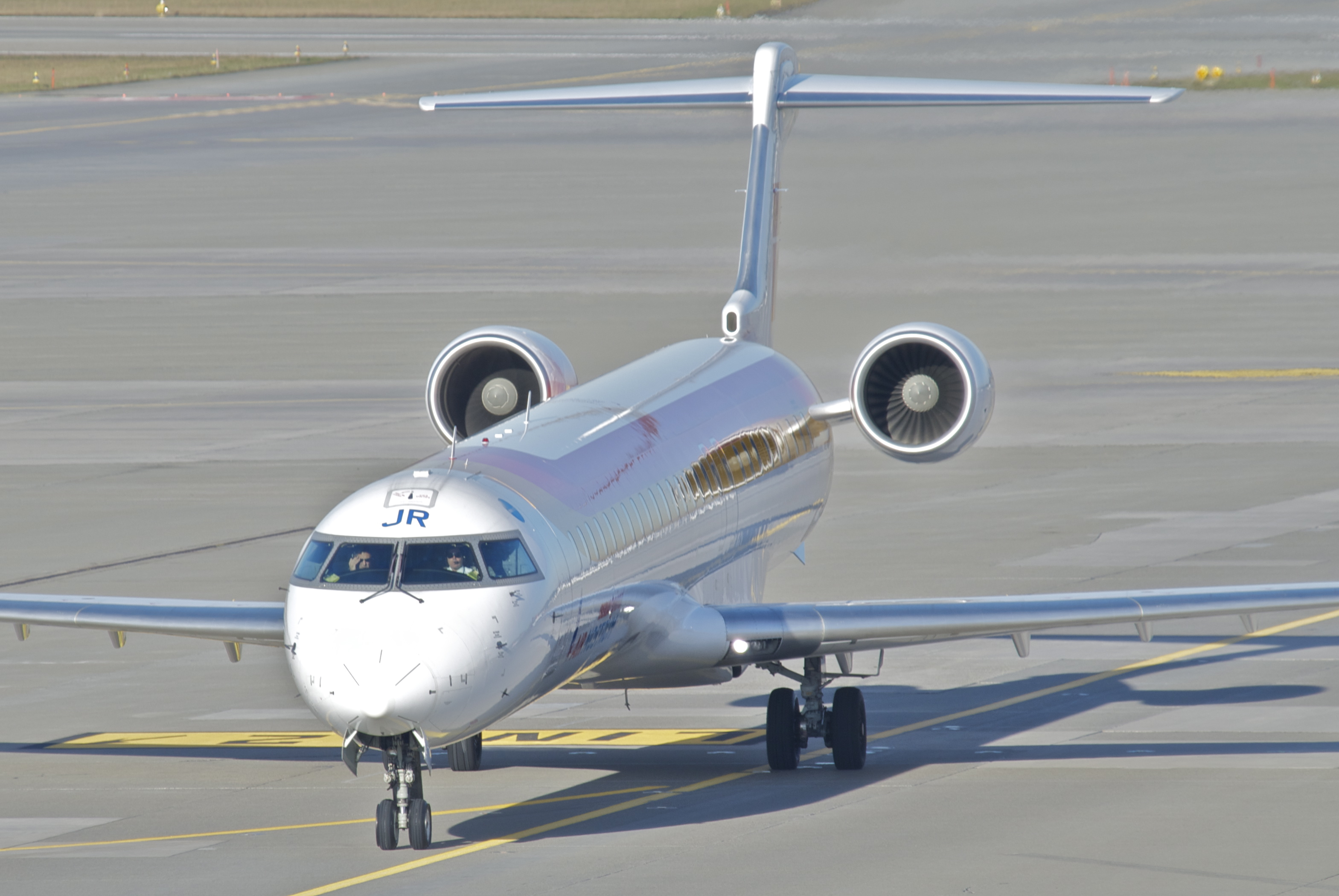
Canadair Regional Jet

In 1986, Bombardier acquired Canadair for C$120 million from the Government of Canada after it recorded the largest corporate loss in Canadian history.

In 1989, the company acquired Short Brothers.

In 1990, it acquired Learjet. In 1992, the company acquired de Havilland Canada from Boeing.

In 1995, the company founded Flexjet. In December 2013, the division was sold for $195 million.

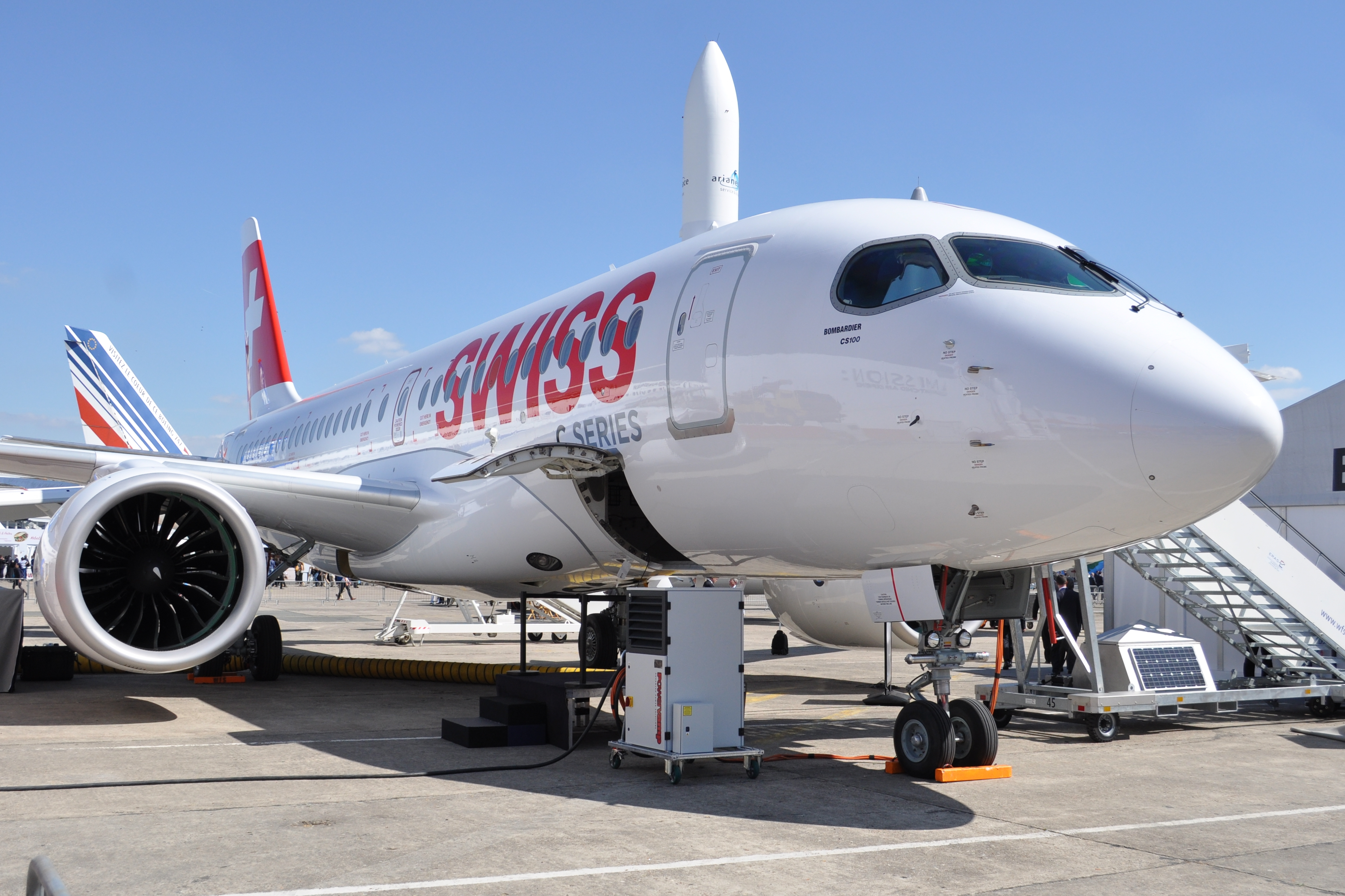
A Bombardier CSeries (Airbus A220) in Swiss livery

On June 29, 2016, Bombardier delivered the first CSeries CS100 aircraft (now called the Airbus A220) to Swiss International Air Lines. Air Canada placed an order for the aircraft one day earlier.

In April 2016, Delta Air Lines placed an order for the aircraft. On September 26, 2017, after Boeing complained that Bombardier was selling the CS100 to Delta Air Lines below cost due to subsidies from the governments of Canada and Quebec, the United States Department of Commerce proposed a 219% tariff on the aircraft. Boeing's complaint stated that the CS100 planes were being sold at US$19.6 million each, below the US$33.2 million production cost. The governments of Canada and the United Kingdom threatened to stop ordering Boeing aircraft since the company was putting aerospace jobs at risk. On January 26, 2018, the United States International Trade Commission overturned the tariffs. Boeing did not appeal.

In July 2018, Airbus acquired a 50.01% stake in the CSeries for one Canadian dollar, with an option to acquire the remaining interest by 2024. Airbus built a second CSeries assembly line at its A320 assembly facility in Mobile, Alabama.

In November 2018, the company announced the sale of its turboprop passenger aircraft unit to an affiliate of Viking Air (which later became De Havilland Canada). It also announced 5,000 layoffs.

In March 2019, the company sold its Business Aircraft Training business to CAE Inc. for $645 million. The business included flight simulators and training devices for the Bombardier Learjet, Challenger, and Global product lines.

On June 25, 2019, Bombardier agreed with Mitsubishi Heavy Industries to sell the CRJ programme, a deal was expected to close in early 2020 subject to regulatory approval. Bombardier will retain the Mirabel assembly facility and produce the CRJ on behalf of Mitsubishi until the current order backlog is complete.

In October 2019, Bombardier announced the sale agreement of its remaining aerostructure division to US company Spirit AeroSystems. The division at time of sale involved component manufacture for new and after-market Bombardier group and Airbus group aircraft models, and also operated in aircraft maintenance, repair and overhaul. Due to how the 2020 pandemic affected the industry, the agreement was renegotiated with the sale to Spirit concluded finally in October 2020. Bombardier's former aerostructures division purchased by Spirit consisted at time of sale of operations in Belfast, UK; Casablanca, Morocco; and Dallas, USA.

The 2019 to 2020 aerostructures division sell-off was described at the time as supporting Bombardier's "strategic decision to reposition itself as a pure-play business aircraft company".

In February 2020, Airbus acquired an additional 25% stake in the A220 for US$591 million. This transaction was the final step to get Bombardier Aviation out of the commercial jet industry.

In February 2026, Learjet acquired Velocity Maintenance Solutions (VMS), a Maintenance, Repair, and Overhaul services provider, from Brown Gibbons Lang & Company for an undisclosed sum.

=== Bombardier Capital ===
Bombardier Capital (BC), a subsidiary of Bombardier Inc., was formed during 1973 in Colchester, Vermont. BC provided secured financing for a dealer's inventory that was purchased from distributors or manufacturers of consumer and recreational products, especially Bombardier Recreational Products, in the United States, Canada and Europe. Their clients consisted of Sea-Doo and Ski-Doo dealers, as well as retailers in multiple industries, primarily manufactured housing, recreational boating and specialty and recreational vehicles. BC also provided a wide variety of domestic/international loans, asset management and leasing services for business aircraft and commercial/industrial products, including technology and telecommunication equipment.

In August 1997 CGI Inc. and BC announced a strategic agreement to offer their clients value-added services. CGI would offer information technology to BC's clients, and BC would provide project financing to CGI's clients. That same year, BC began transitioning loan origination and servicing to Jacksonville, Florida. Bombardier Capital's operations were located at 12735 Gran Bay Parkway West, Suite 1000 in the Flagler Center. BC ceased loan originations in 2001, then in 2005, BC sold their Inventory Finance Division to GE Commercial Finance before shutting down operations.

=== Military ===
The company acquired the rights to the Volkswagen Iltis in 1981. Production ceased in 1989.

When UTDC was acquired by Bombardier in 1991 several military products were added:

UTDC 24M32 - HLVW military trucks based on the Steyr 91 (Percheron)

- MLVW military trucks based on the M35 2-1/2 ton cargo truck

In 2003, the company sold its arms industry division in Canada. Military Aviation Services was sold to SPAR Aerospace. Land-based arms industry products made by Urban Transportation Development Corporation ceased operations.

=== Public transport bus in Ireland ===
In the late 1970s, in the Republic of Ireland, CIÉ (now Bus Éireann and Dublin Bus) commissioned a range of single and double-decker buses to be designed and produced.

CIÉ looked for partners to build these buses in Ireland, eventually finding two: Bombardier, and the United States–based General Automotive Corporation (GAC) from Ann Arbor, Michigan. The two companies formed a new company Bombardier Ireland Limited, 51% owned by Bombardier and 49% owned by GAC. In 1982, CIÉ bought 187 Bombardier buses during the year, bringing the total on Dublin city services to 276 by 31 December 1982. In August 1983, Bombardier sold its shares to GAC, with the company renamed GAC Ireland Limited.

A row of Bombardier KD buses in Dublin in the 1980s

The prototypes were devised in Germany and production of 51 express coaches (KE type) and 366 double-decker buses (KD type) were assembled between 1980 and 1983 at a facility in Shannon, County Clare. They remained in service until 1997 and 2001, respectively. Some surviving examples are now exhibited at the National Transport Museum of Ireland at Howth Castle. During their time operating in Dublin, the distinctive, green KD-type Bombardier buses became "synonymous" with the city.

=== Rail equipment ===
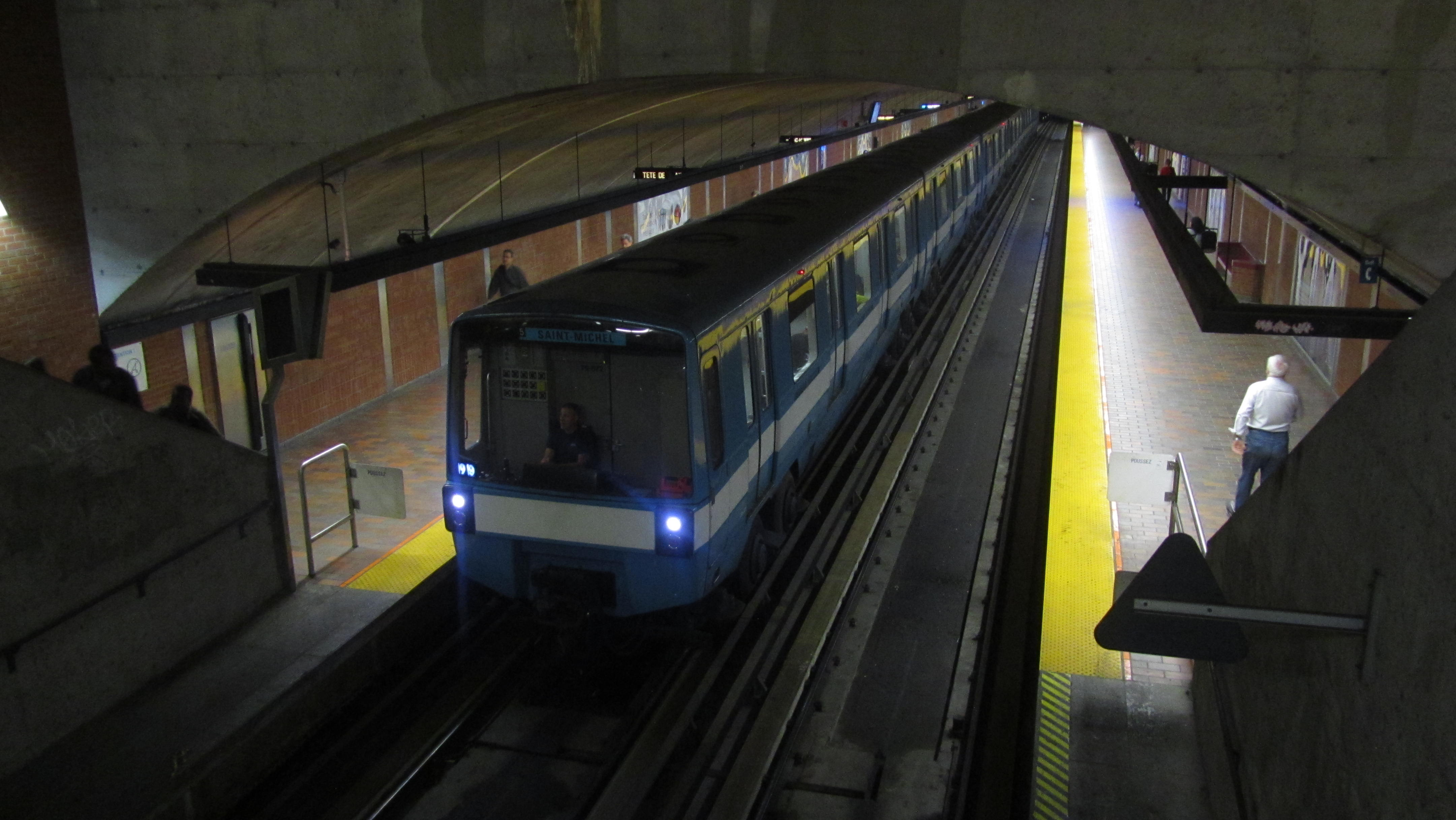
An MR-73 train arriving at D'Iberville station, September 2018

The company diversified into rail transport after the 1970s energy crisis reduced demand for snowmobiles.

In 1974, the company received its first order – to build MR-73 trains for Société de transport de Montréal for use on the Montreal Metro. In 1975, the company acquired Montreal Locomotive Works. It was sold to General Electric in 1988.

In 1982, the company won a contract from New York's Metropolitan Transportation Authority to build 825 R62A cars for the New York City Subway for $663 million.

In 1985, the company ceased manufacturing locomotives and concentrated on producing passenger train rolling stock. It acquired a 45% stake in La Brugeoise et Nivelles (formerly BN Constructions Ferroviaires et Métalliques) based in Bruges in 1986, the assets of U.S. railcar manufacturers Budd Company and Pullman Company in 1987, and ANF Industrie based in Crespin, Nord, France in 1989. A series of acquisitions in the United Kingdom, Germany, Switzerland, Canada, and Mexico further increased operations.

In 1996, the company was selected as the lead developer for the Acela Express trains, the fastest trains in North America, in a $710 million contract. Problems with the trains resulted in lawsuits between the company and Amtrak.

In 2001, Bombardier acquired Adtranz (DaimlerChrysler Rail Systems), a manufacturer of trains which were widely used throughout Germany and Great Britain, becoming one of the largest manufacturers of railway rolling stock in the world. This division produced the Bombardier Turbostar.

In 2005, it launched the Bombardier Zefiro high-speed rail, with speeds of 200–380 km/h (120–240 mph), for the Ministry of Railways (China).

In 2007, Bombardier won a $14m contract from LDZ of a total $45m to improve the signalling system on the East-West Rail Corridor of Latvia.

On February 13, 2020, Alstom agreed to buy the Bombardier Transportation division for €7 billion. The acquisition deal was completed on January 29, 2021.

=== Bombardier Recreational Products ===
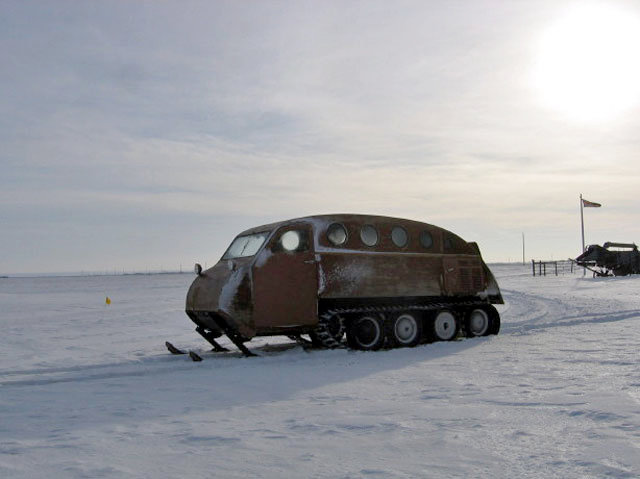
1951 Bombardier B12 Snow Bus Snowmobile

In January 1934, a blizzard prevented Joseph-Armand Bombardier from reaching the nearest hospital in time to save his two-year-old son, Yvon, who died from appendicitis complicated by peritonitis.

Bombardier was a mechanic who dreamed of building a vehicle that could "float on snow". In 1935, in a repair shop in Valcourt, Quebec, he designed and produced the first snowmobile using a drive system he developed that revolutionized travel in snow and swampy conditions.

In 1937, he patented and sold 12 of the 7-passenger "B7" snow coaches. They were used in rural Quebec to take children to school, carry freight, deliver mail, and as ambulances. In 1941, Bombardier opened a factory in Valcourt.

In 1942, L'Auto-Neige Bombardier Limitée ("Bombardier Snow Car Limited") was founded in Valcourt.

During World War II, the Government of Canada issued wartime rationing regulations. Bombardier customers had to prove that snowmobiles were essential to their livelihood in order to buy one. The company then shifted its focus to the arms industry.

In 1947, during a blizzard in Saskatchewan, the company received positive press coverage when army snowmobiles resupplied isolated radio communication towers.

In 1948, the Government of Quebec passed a law requiring all roads to be cleared of snow; Bombardier's sales fell by nearly half in one year. Armand Bombardier therefore decided to diversify his business, first by producing tracked snowplows sized specifically for use on municipal sidewalks, replacing horse-drawn vehicles, then by making all-terrain vehicles for the mining, petroleum, and forestry industries.

The machines had removable front skis that could be replaced with front wheels for use on paved or hard surfaces, thus providing greater utility to his large snowmobiles. In 1951, the wooden bodies were replaced with sheet steel, and these vehicles were powered by Chrysler flathead six-cylinder engines and 3-speed manual transmissions.

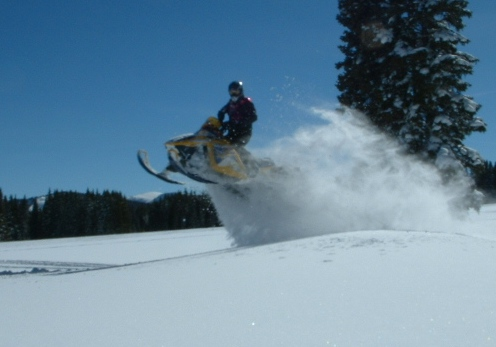
Ski-Doo snowmobile

In the early 1950s, Bombardier focused on developing a snowmobile for 1 or 2 passengers. A breakthrough occurred in 1957 when Bombardier developed a one-piece molded rubber continuous track with enough durability to provide snow-gripping traction for lightweight vehicles. The vehicle was called the "Ski-Dog" because it was meant to replace the dog sled for hunters and trappers. However, in 1958, "Ski-Doo" was accidentally painted on the first prototype, and immediately became the popular name.

The public soon discovered the great fun of speedy vehicles zooming over snow, and a new winter sport was born, centered in Quebec. In the first year, Bombardier sold 225 Ski-Doos; four years later, 8,210 were sold. Bombardier slowed promotion of the Ski-Doo line to prevent it from crowding out other company products, while still dominating the snowmobile industry against competitors Polaris Industries and Arctic Cat.

In 1963, Roski was created in Roxton Falls, Quebec as a manufacturer of composite parts for the Ski-Doo. In the 1960s, V-8 engines were added.

On February 18, 1964, J. Armand Bombardier died of cancer at age 56. Until then, he oversaw all areas of operation and controlled the research department, making all the drawings himself. The younger generation took over, led by Armand's sons and sons-in-law, reorganizing and decentralizing the company. The company adopted computer inventory, accounting, and billing. Distribution networks were improved and increased, and an incentive program was developed for sales staff. That year, a survey was mailed to Ski-Doo owners to find out how the product was being used. Germain Bombardier, who had been groomed by his father, took over the company upon his father's death in 1964. However, he quit and sold his shares in 1966 after a disagreement with other family members. Laurent Beaudoin, the son-in-law of the founder, then became president, a position he held until 1999. He had joined the company as controller in 1963 and was president for 25 years.

In 1967, the company was renamed Bombardier Limited. By that time, the snowmobiles were very useful for the Inuit.

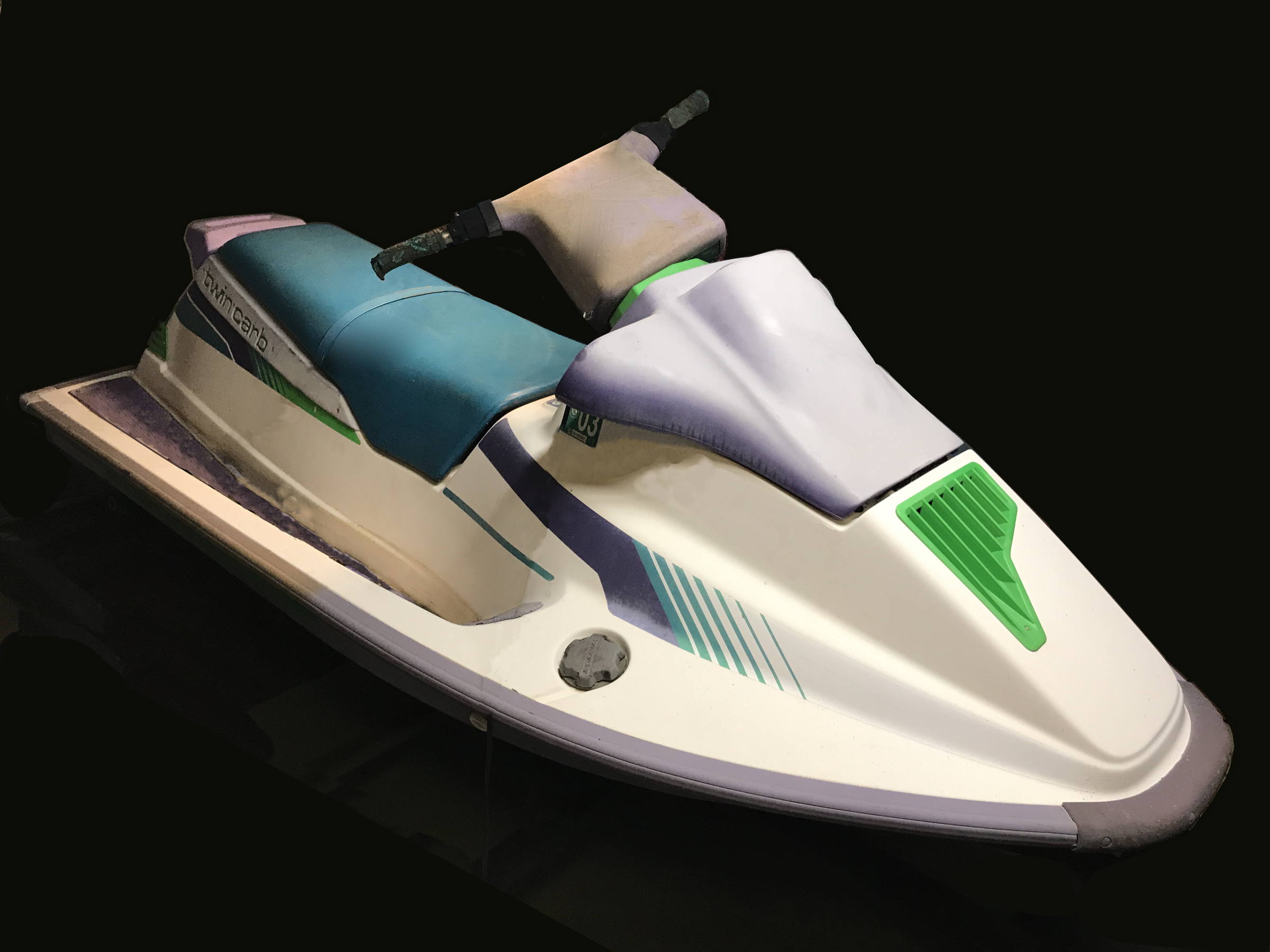
SeaDoo personal watercraft

In 1968, Clayton Jacobson II invented the jet ski and the company licensed his patents to create the Sea-Doo personal watercraft.

On January 23, 1969, the company became a public company, listing on the Montreal Exchange and the Toronto Stock Exchange.

In 1969 to 1970, the standard round windows reminiscent of portholes were replaced with larger rectangular windows that provided more interior light. A change was made to the Chrysler Industrial 318 engines with the automatic Loadflite transmissions.

In 1970, the company acquired Rotax, an engine manufacturer based in Gunskirchen, Austria.

In 1971, Bombardier acquired Moto-Ski. Also in 1971, Bombardier launched Operation SnoPlan, a program to promote snowmobile safety after a mounting death toll due to snowmobile accidents.

In the 1970s, the company began producing Can-Am motorcycles, which included Rotax engines.

By 1990, the first product of the company, the Ski-Doo snowmobile, had become its weakest part gaging up deficits and high inventories.

In 2003, the company sold Bombardier Recreational Products to a group of investors: Bain Capital (50%), Bombardier Family (35%) and Caisse de dépôt et placement du Québec (15%) for $875 million.
