= Ski-Doo =

Snowmobile brand

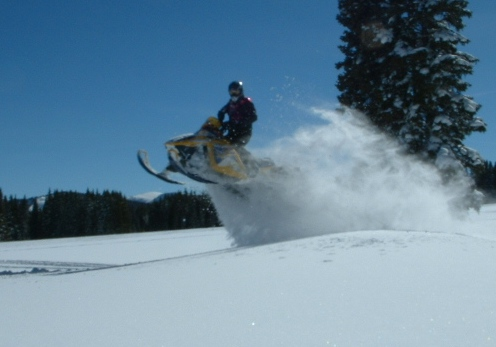
- Ski-Doo XRS 800
- Product type: Snowmobile
- Current owner: Bombardier Recreational Products
- Country: Canada
- Introduced: 1959
- Related brands: Sea-Doo
- Website: https://www.ski-doo.brp.com/

Ski-Doo is a brand name of snowmobile manufactured by Bombardier Recreational Products (originally Bombardier Inc. before the spin-off). The Ski-Doo personal snowmobile brand is so iconic, especially in Canada, that it was listed in 17th place on the CBC's The Greatest Canadian Invention list in 2007.

Ski-Doo also has its own range of snowmobile suits.

== History ==
The first ever Ski-Doo was launched in 1959 as a new invention created by Joseph-Armand Bombardier. The original name was Ski-Dog, but a typographical error in a Bombardier brochure changed the name Ski-Dog to Ski-Doo. Upon discovery of the typo, Bombardier considered that typo a fortuitous development since he felt it not only sounded appealing, but it was distinctive and simple to trademark for his vehicle.

The first Ski-Doos found customers with missionaries, trappers, prospectors, land surveyors and others who need to travel in snowy, remote areas. The largest success for the snowmobile came from sport enthusiasts, a market that opened the door to massive production of snowmobiles. This popularity led to skidoo (sometimes ski-doo), with the derived verb skidooing (or ski-dooing), becoming a generic term (genericized trademark) for snowmobile in much of Canada.

In 1967 and 1968, Ski-Doos were used on the first undisputed overland expedition to reach the North Pole, led by Ralph Plaisted and including Bombardier's own Jean-Luc Bombardier, reaching the pole on 19 April 1968.

In early 2016, Ski-Doo announced that they were releasing an all-new line of engine/chassis fusion snowmobiles, most of which would be sporting two-stroke engines with 800cc motors that were specifically designed for the newer snowmobiles. The company then announced that their new line of model year 2017 snowmobiles would feature an 850cc motor known as the Rotax 850 E-Tec. The motor was redesigned with a new chassis, making the snowmobile both more agile and more responsive. Ski-Doo named this newer chassis/motor combination "Gen-4" and released it in several different models, such as the Summit, MXZ, and Renegade.

== See also ==
- List of generic and genericized trademarks
