= Snowcat =

Enclosed-cab, truck-sized, fully tracked vehicle designed for over-snow travel

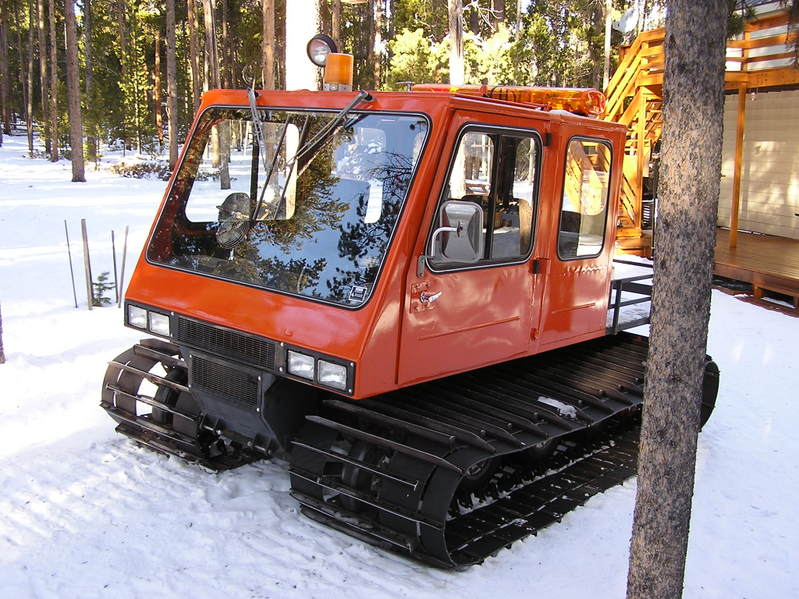
The wide tracks of this 1991 Logan snowcat reduce the ground pressure and improve grip but render it vulnerable to bumps

A snowcat (a portmanteau of snow and caterpillar) is an enclosed-cab, truck-sized, fully tracked vehicle designed to travel over snow. Major manufacturers are PistenBully (Germany), Prinoth (Italy), and Tucker (United States).

== Snow groomers ==
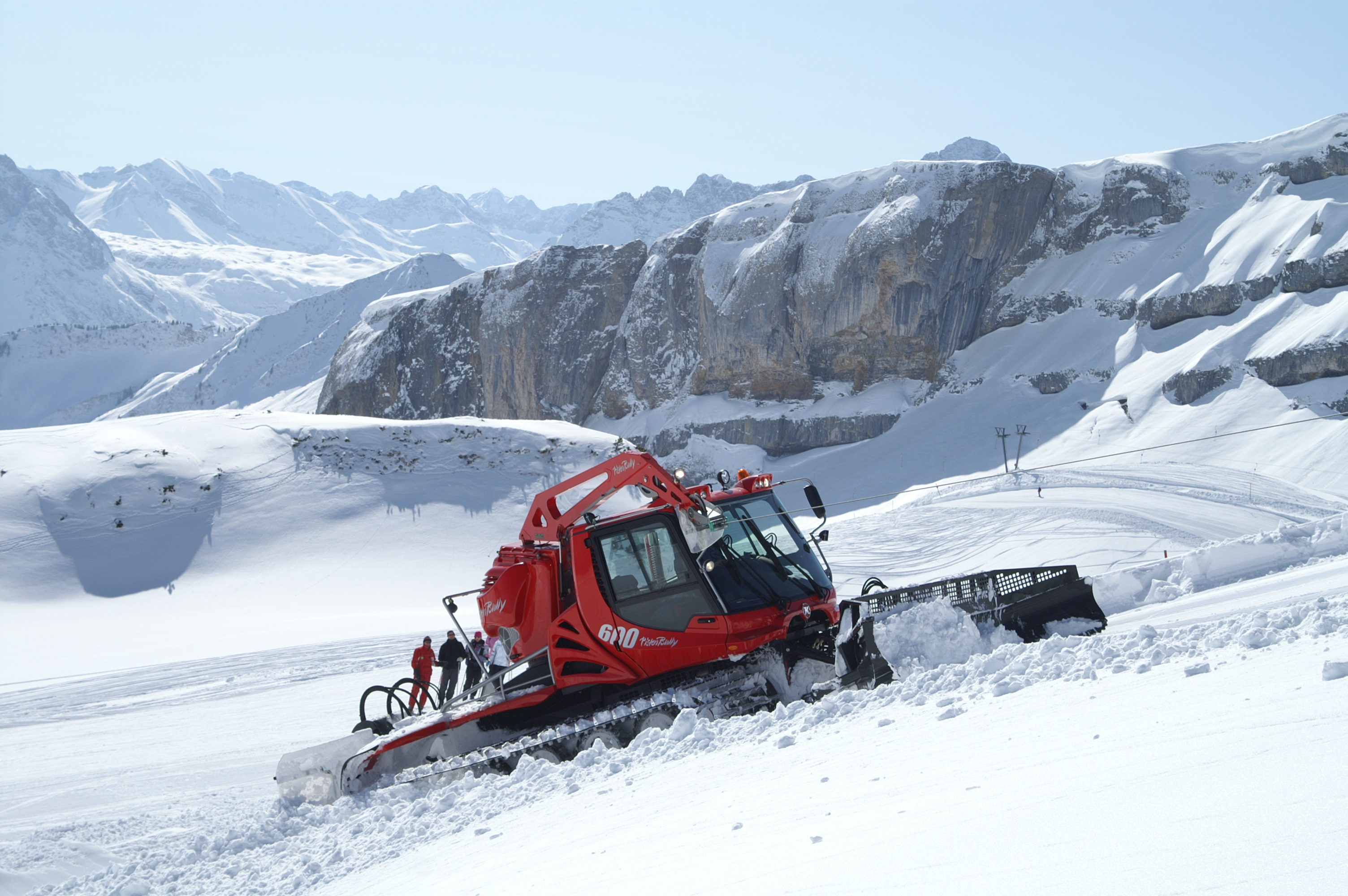
A PistenBully 600 working in 2006

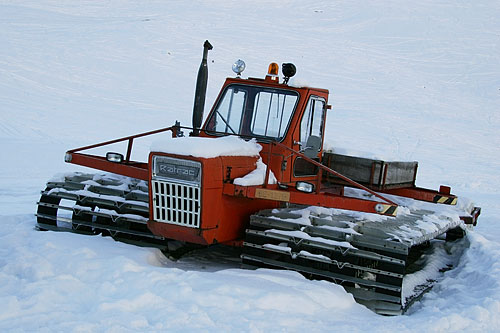
An old Ratrac snowcat on the Grimmialp in Switzerland in 2006

A snowcat dedicated to snow maintenance rather than transport is known as a snow groomer. Other terms are "piste machines", "trail groomers" (in North American English) or "piste bashers" (in British English) because of their use in preparing ski trails ("pistes") or snowmobile trails.

== Other functions ==
In addition to grooming snow they are used for polar expeditions, logging in marsh areas, leveling sugar beet piles, medical evacuations, and seismic studies in the wilderness.

== Design ==
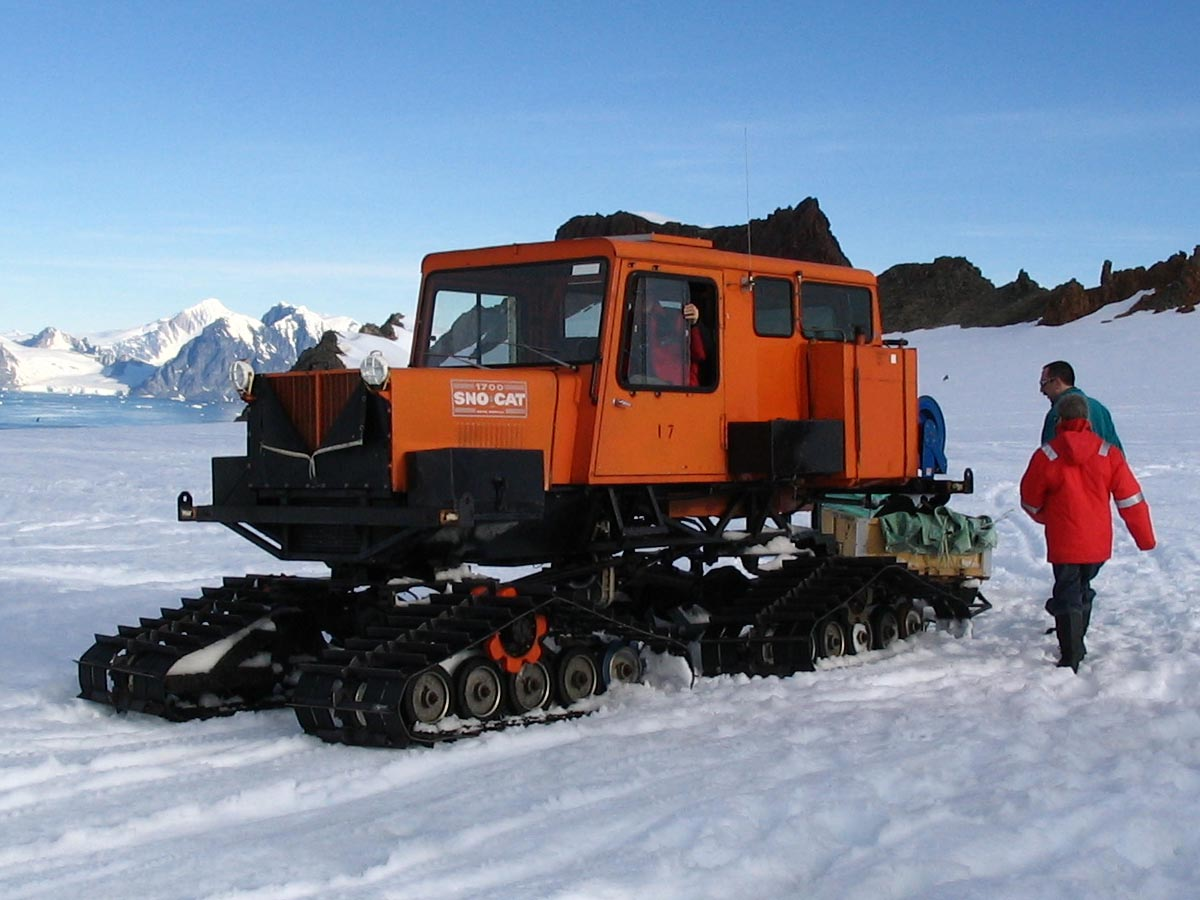
A Tucker Sno-Cat at the Rothera Research Station, Antarctica

Most snowcats, such as the ones produced by Bombardier or Aktiv in the past, have two tracks, fitted with a Christie suspension or a Horstmann suspension. Others, like the Tucker Sno-Cat and Hägglunds Bandvagn 206 vehicles, have a complex arrangement of four or more tracks.

The tracks are usually made of rubber, aluminum or steel and driven by a single sprocket on each side, and ride over rubber wheels with a solid foam interior. Their design is optimized for a snow surface, or soft grounds such as that of a peat bog.

The cabs are optimized for use in cold conditions worsened by wind chill, with strong forced heating and a windshield designed to be kept clear of internal and external ice or condensation through a variety of means such as advanced coatings, external scrapers (windshield wipers of a modified type), and internal ducts blowing hot air on the surface.

== History ==
The forerunners of the snowcat were the tracked "motors" designed by Captain Scott and his engineer Reginald Skelton for the Antarctic Terra Nova Expedition of 1910–1913. These tracked motors were built by the Wolseley Tool and Motor Car Company in Birmingham.

Theodore P. Flynn and the United States Forestry Service in Oregon developed a snow tractor in 1937.

The name "snowcat" originates from the 1946 trademark by Tucker Sno-Cat Corporation of Medford, Oregon. This specialized over-snow vehicle dominated the snow transportation market until the 1960s when other manufacturers entered the business. By then "snowcat" was such a common description that it was used to describe all over-snow vehicles (see generic trademark). Tucker is also well known for its use of four tracks on its vehicles. Tucker Sno-Cat is arguably the best known of the early manufacturers and remains in business today. Tucker Sno-Cats have been used by numerous military, governmental agencies and utilities.

Competitive snowcat trials were conducted by the U.S. Soil Conservation Service in Sun Valley, Idaho from 1950-1952.

In the 1955–1958 Fuchs and Hillary Transantarctic Expedition, four modern snowcats were used, produced by the Tucker Sno-Cat Corporation. These vehicles were highly modified for the purposes of the expedition.

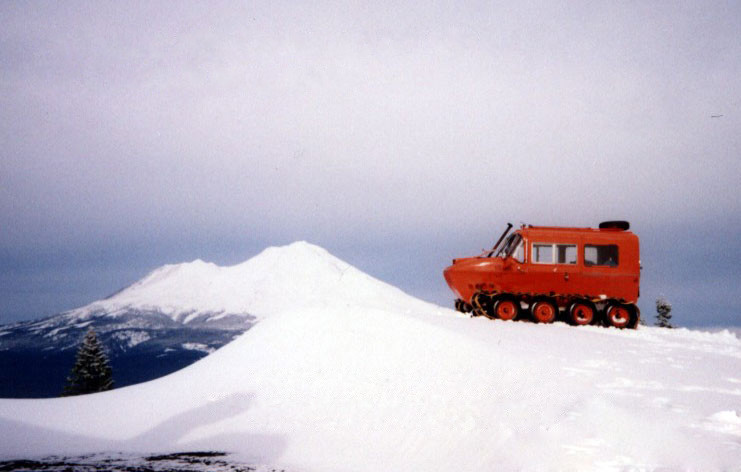
1959 Kristi KT-3

Between 1956 and 1968, Kristi Company made two-track snowcats in Colorado but ceased production with fewer than 200 total units sold.

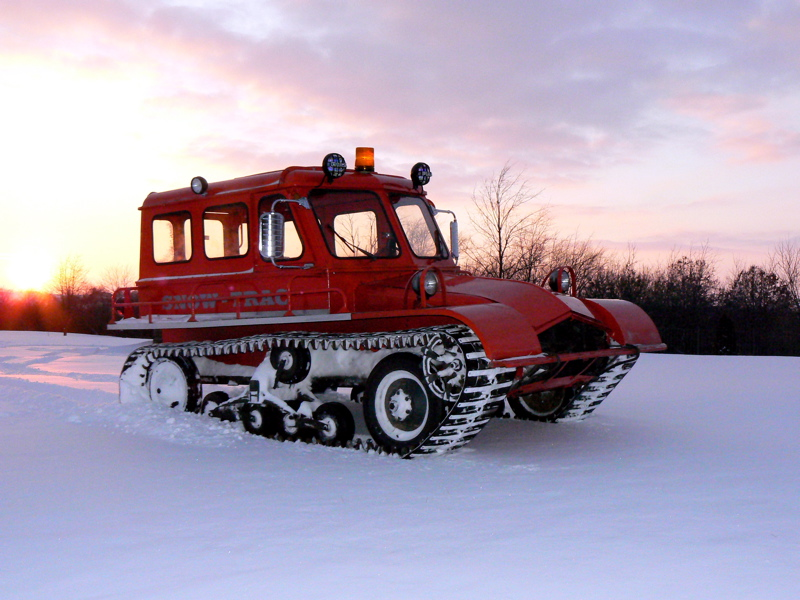
1972 Aktiv Snow Trac ST4

Another early model was the Swedish made Aktiv Snow Trac of which 2265 were manufactured in Sweden between 1957 and 1981. The Snow Trac was used by NATO forces, and by research organizations such as A.N.A.R.E. in Antarctica. Over 1000 Snow Tracs were imported to Canada and the United States, mostly by Canadian utilities and U.S. governmental agencies; the Snow Trac is still in common use in private ownership. An updated version called "Sno Trac" is produced by an Idaho company.

Around 1959 Bruce Nodwell Ltd. of Canada produced the Nodwell 110, which in 1965 became a new company, Foremost Industries.

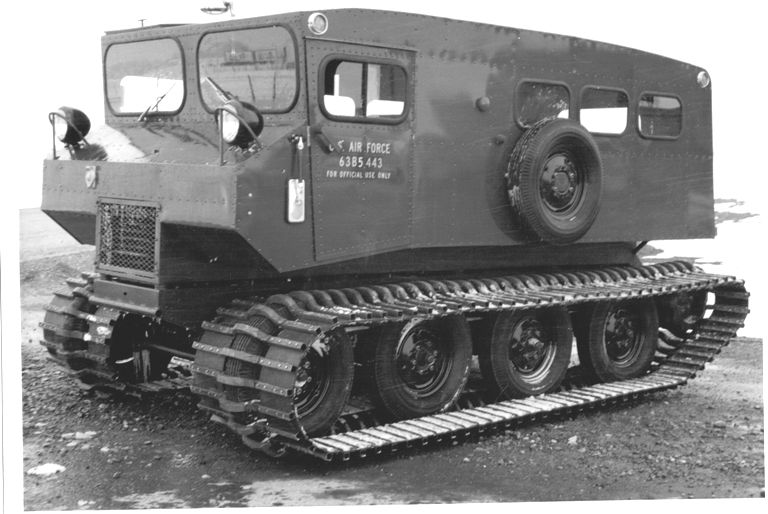
1963 Thiokol 601 Trackmaster

Thiokol was another American maker of snowcats, notably the Imp, Super Imp and Spryte dual-track models. Thiokol manufactured an amphibious version of the Spryte, called the Swamp Spryte. Thiokol sold its ski-lift and snowcat operation in 1978 to John DeLorean, and changed its name to DeLorean Manufacturing Company (DMC). DMC was later bought out by its management team and renamed Logan Machine Company (LMC). LMC ceased production around 2000. The Spryte, sold later as 1200 and 1500 series machines, are still popular in commercial, industrial use, and as privately owned snowcats. In 2002 Ohara acquired the rights to make LMC models.

Russia as one of the snowiest countries in the world has a wide range of snowcat producers, from the 30-ton load capacity two linked-track Vityaz vehicles to 0.4-2 ton load capacity ZZGT vehicles.

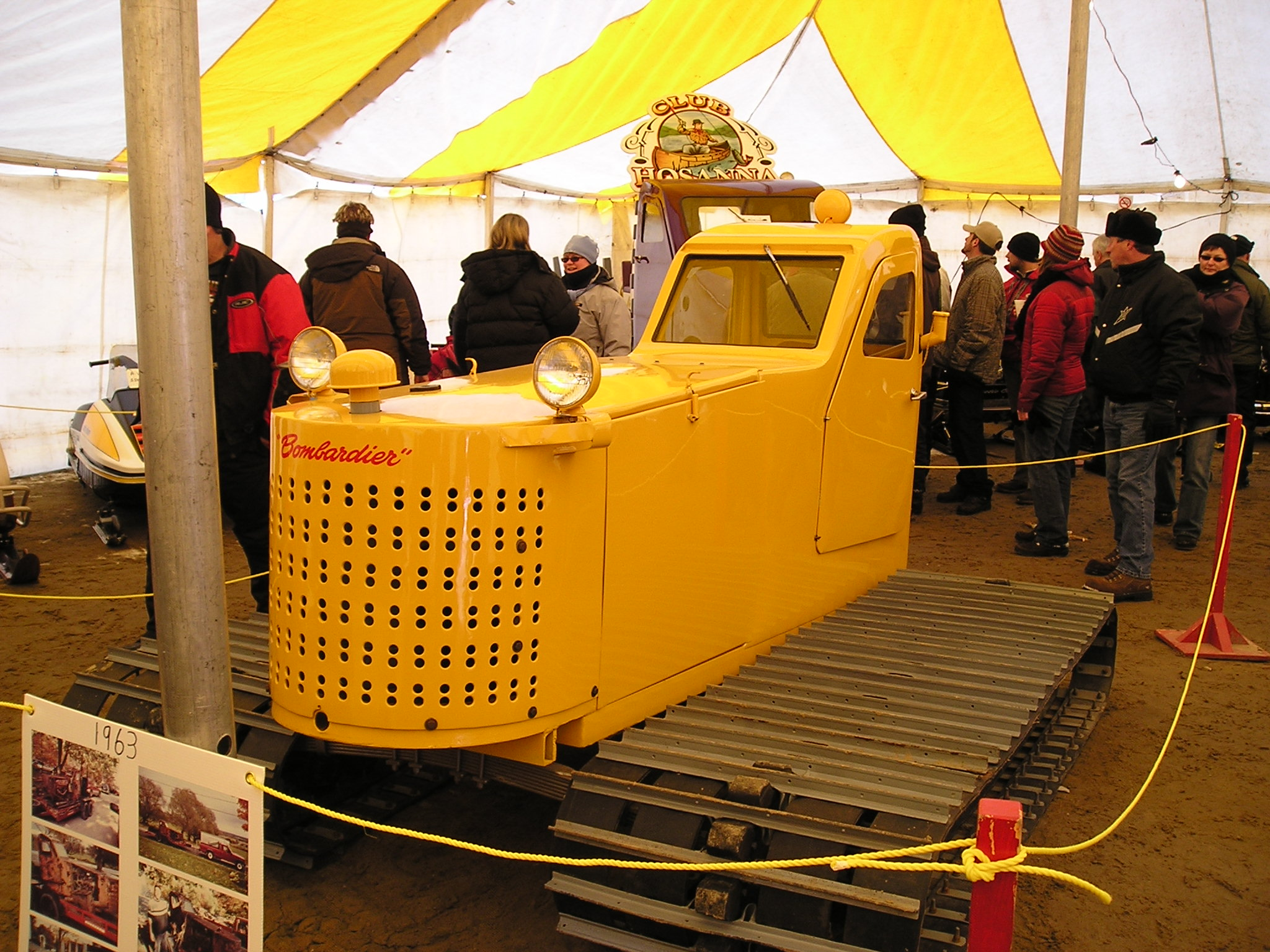
1961 Bombardier Snowpacker

Bombardier has been in the snowcat business from 1961 but has radically altered its business model and product selection. Bombardier sold over 3,000 of its popular snow bus models which are still in use today and in popular demand by dedicated collectors. Bombardier sold its snow groomer business to Camoplast in 2004 who in turn sold to it to Leitner Group/Prinoth in 2005.

By 1964, Prinoth was mass-producing the P15 snow groomer.

Kässbohrer began producing the widely-used PistenBully starting in 1970 with the PB145, with 10,000 of all models sold by the mid 1990s. They launched their 100% electric snow groomer in 2019.

Finland companies Formatic (from 1970 to 2008) and Keiteleen Latukone Oy were purchased by Kässbohrer in 2008.

In 1972 Japanese Ohara snow groomers worked the Sapporo Winter Olympic Games.

Starting in the 1990s Italy's Favero Snow Tech made compact F170 and Snow Rabbit models.

Also in the 1990s Zaugg of Switzerland began offering tracked half-pipe groomers.

From 1995 VMC Right Track and then UTV International have manufactured tracked vehicles.

== Current market ==
From a market size of $372 million in 2021, the global snow groomer production may exceed $468 million by 2030.

== Gallery ==
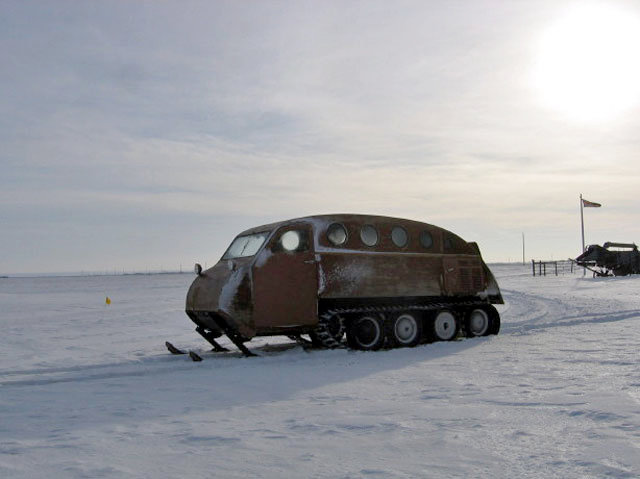
Bombardier B12 snow bus

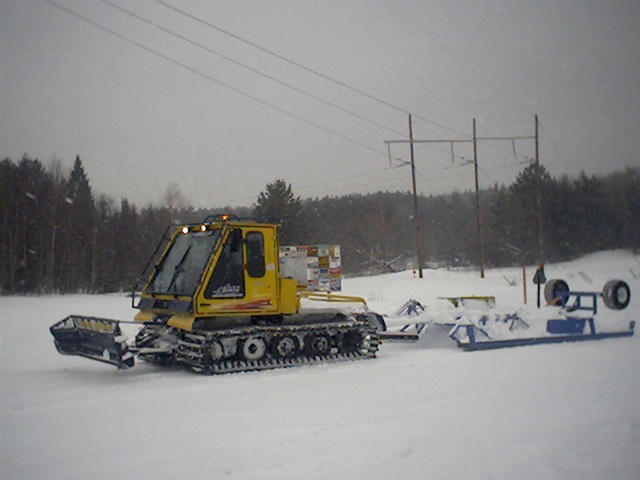
Bombardier BR180 snowcat pulling snowmobile trail groomer attachment

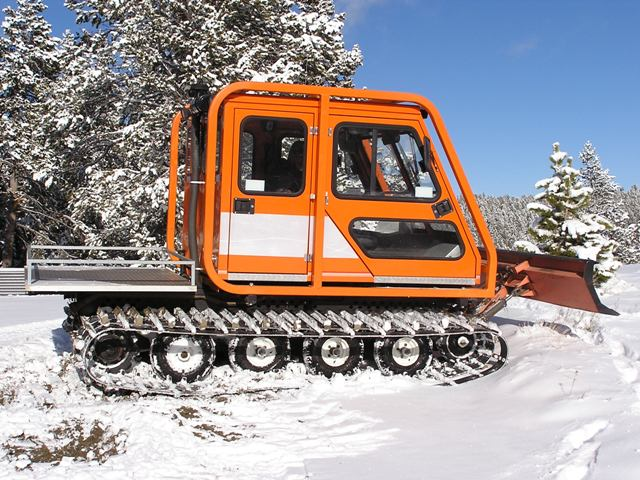
VMC 1500 Snow Groomer

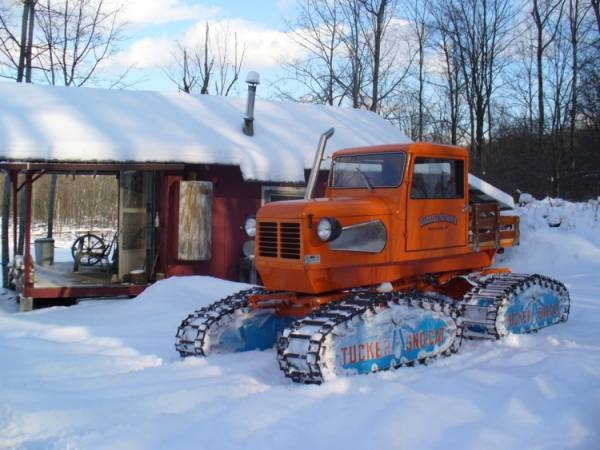
Restored Tucker Sno-Cat

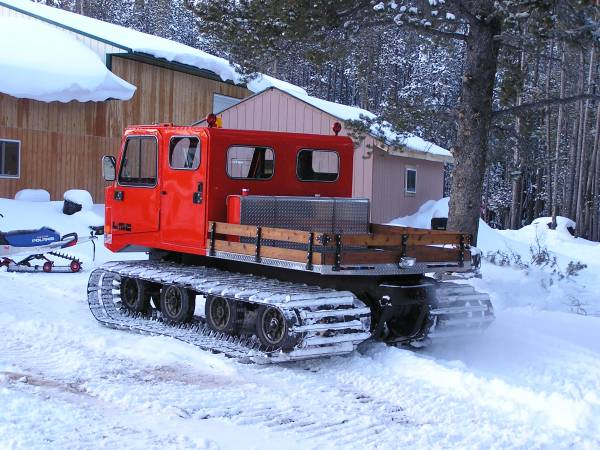
Restored 1989 LMC 1200 snowcat manufactured by Logan Machine Company

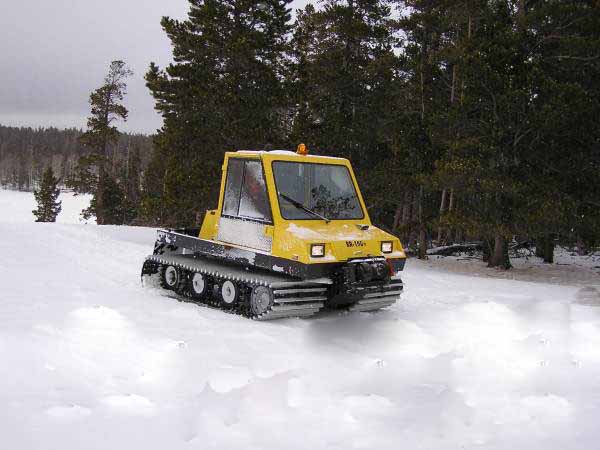
Bombardier BR100+ Snow Groomer

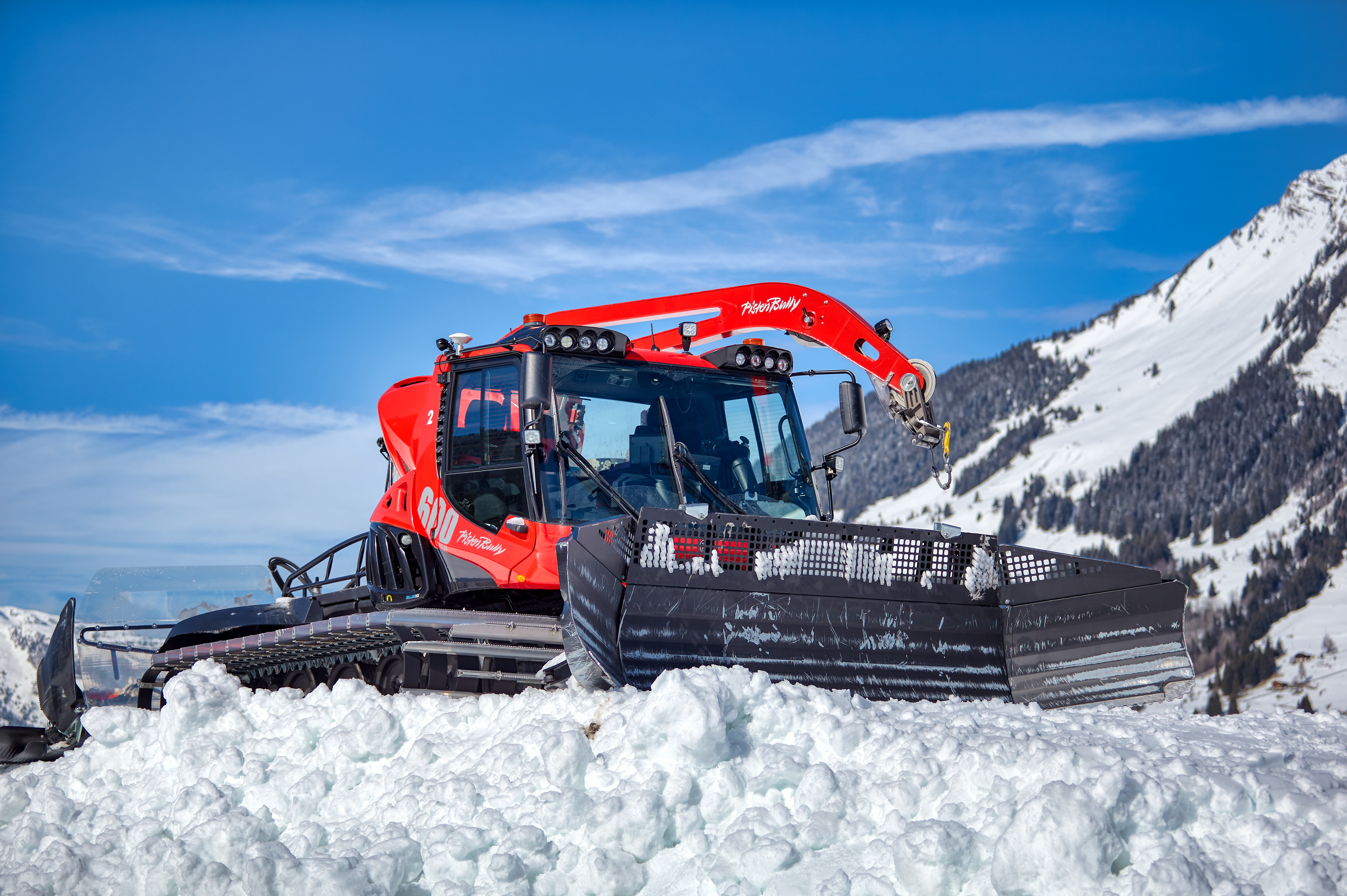
Kässbohrer PistenBully 600 Polar in Les Diablerets, Switzerland.

== See also ==
- Antarctic snow cruiser
- Bandvagn 202
- Bandvagn 206
- BvS 10
- Continuous track (the method of propulsion of a snowcat)
- M29 Weasel
- Snow coach
- Snowcat skiing
- ZIL-2906

== Notes and references ==
=== Books ===
- Preston, Diana (1999). A First Rate Tragedy: Captain Scott's Antarctic Expeditions (paperback ed.). London: Constable. ISBN 978-0-09-479530-3. OCLC 59395617.
