= Snow Trac =

Small Swedish snowcat

Overview
- Manufacturer: Aktiv Fischer
- Production: 1957–1981
- Designer: Lars Larsson

Body and chassis
- Layout: rubber tracks

Powertrain
- Engine: Volkswagen air-cooled flat-4

Dimensions
- Length: 12 ft (3.7 m)
- Width: 6 ft 2 in (1.88 m)

Aktiv Fischer Snow Trac is a small personal Snowcat that is roughly the size of a modern compact car. Aktiv Snow Trac were manufactured in Sweden, with additional vehicles manufactured in Scotland. It was sold on the market between 1957 and 1981.

== Origins and description ==
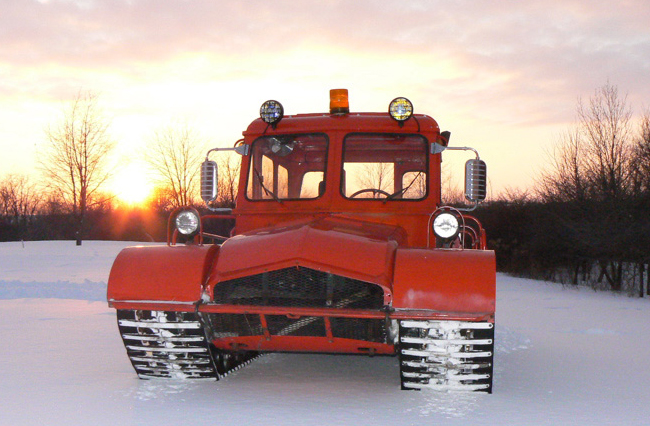
1972 Snow Trac ST4 7 passenger cabin variant

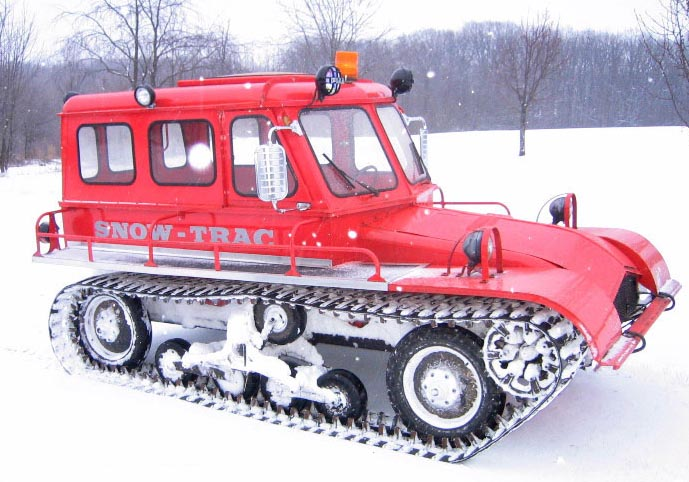
VW powered Snow Trac, 54hp, 4 manual speed transmission

In 1954, Lars Larsson, the chief design engineer for a Swedish farm equipment company, AB Westeråsmaskiner, decided to develop a tracked vehicle to take him and his brother on fishing trips in the winter. The company put his snow vehicle into production in 1957. It uses a steering mechanism called a variator that allows a tracked vehicle to be steered using a traditional automotive steering wheel instead of levers. It runs on two rubber tracks powered by a Volkswagen flat 4 industrial boxer style engine and is suitable for both deep snow and soft surface use. The engine developed about 40 horsepower, but that varied from year to year as the earlier models developed 36 hp, and later models developed 54 hp. With a length of approximately 12 ft (3.7 m) and width of 6 ft 2 in (1.88 m) the vehicle is the size of a small car.

In the standard cabin configuration, only the driver is facing forward. The interior is equipped with side-facing bench seats and there are enough seats for 7 people (including the driver). The entrance is by a door attached at the tail. There are no other entrances, but many are equipped with a large sunroof, which could double as an emergency exit. Unlike most other snow vehicles, the Snow Trac uses a traditional steering wheel instead of levers. Early brochures describe it as follows: "As easy to drive as a car."

== Mechanicals ==
The Snow Trac is made up largely of off the shelf automotive and industrial parts supplied by Volkswagen including an air cooled flat 4 industrial version of VW Beetle engine, a VW Bus transmission, and hundreds of surplus parts including steering wheels, shift knobs, and lighting components. A proprietary drive variator was adapted to the transmission to allow the use of a steering wheel to control the tracks. The variator steplessly changes the speed of the left and right tracks, accelerating one track while slowing the other to effect a turn. Unlike traditional tracked vehicle steering, the brakes are not used to turn, increasing efficiency and reducing brake wear. Production of the air-cooled VW engine ceased in 1981 in Europe and this effectively led to the demise of the Snow Trac, which ended factory production in Sweden.

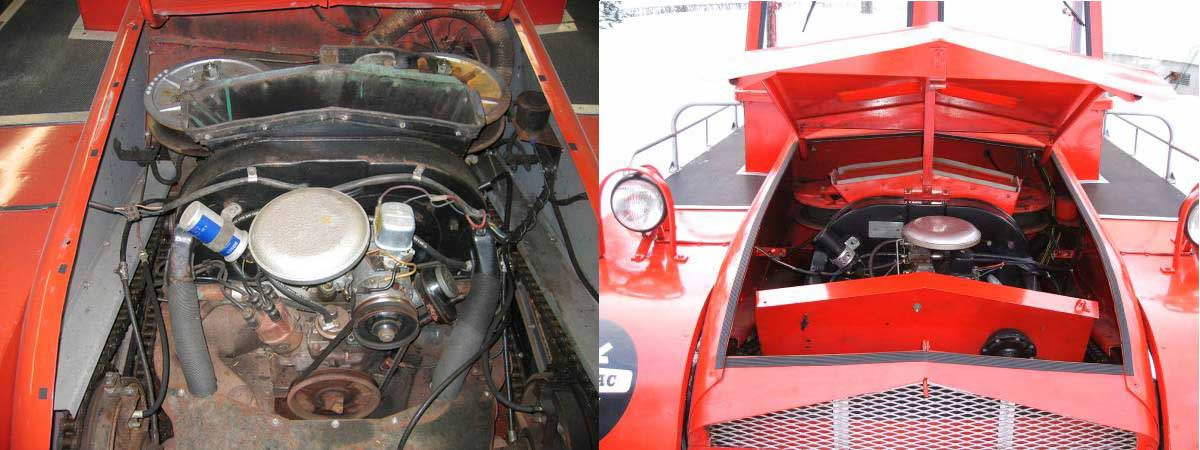
VW industrial engines used in 2 different versions of the Snow Trac engine compartment

Because of the common use of Volkswagen engines, transmissions and other critical parts, the Snow Trac is still a very popular vehicle with many 30- to 40-year-old vehicles being used daily during the winter months. Snow Trac vehicles are commonly used as personal vehicles for transport, and are often used for providing tours to tourists in remote areas. The Roughwoods Inn, located in Nenana Alaska, runs a small fleet of Snow Tracs and Snow Masters for tourists in the winter months. The fleet at The Roughwoods Inn is probably the largest fleet in ownership today. Other resorts and hotels also use Snow Tracs and other models of snowcats to provide tours to remote snowbound areas.

Snow Tracs in use today are often modified and it is common to find overheating problems plaguing these machines because heat shield have been removed to make it easier to work on the engines. There were two primary types of heat shields that were installed in Snow Tracs, a vertical heat shield that divided the engine compartment fore and aft or a horizontal heat shield that separated the muffler area from the rest of the engine compartment. In either case the function was ultimately the same, to keep the exhaust and muffler heat away from the engine. The vertical heat shield seems to have been commonly utilized on the Royal Marines and N.A.T.O. versions of the Snow Trac, it may also have been used in civilian versions. The horizontal heat shield is the most commonly found on Snow Tracs.

== Usage ==
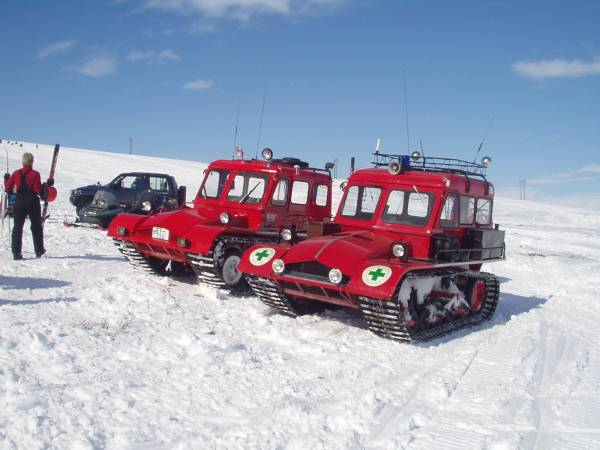
Icelandic Snow Tracs currently in use as remote region Search & Rescue vehicles

While manufactured in Sweden, the Snow Trac proved to be a successful export with over half sold to North America. Approximately 550 Snow Tracs were shipped to Alaska. At least 200 units were shipped to Canadian telephone utility Northwest Telephone in the Yukon Territory, Canada. Approximately 200 Snow Tracs ended up at the Canadian National Railway, and Snow Tracs were also located at each of the microwave sites along the length of the Alaska Canadian Highway (ALCAN). At least 400 more Snow Tracs were known to have been shipped to the Lower 48 states of the United States. At least 200 were known to have been shipped to Scotland.

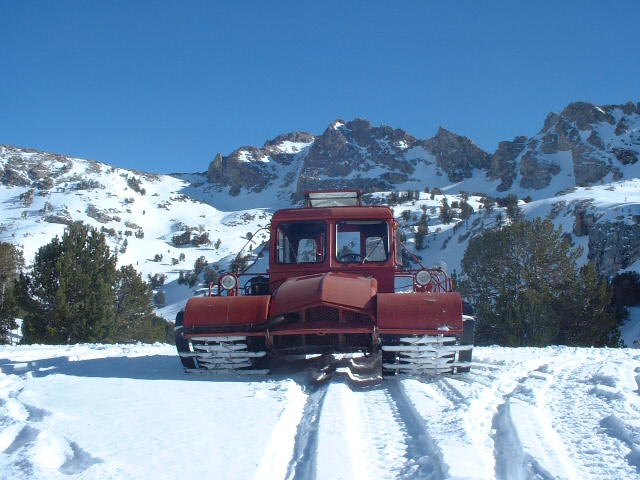
Wide track Snow Master version of the Snow Trac used for deep powder snow conditions

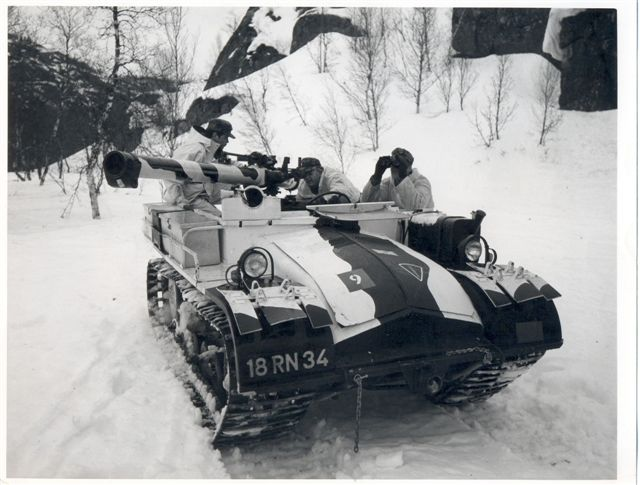
Royal Marines open version of Snow Trac with a L6 Wombat 120mm recoilless rifle anti-tank weapon

The ability to configure the basic vehicle in many different ways allowed it to be suitable for multiple uses. In addition to the standard seven-person cabin, the Snow Trac was also available with a two-person enclosed cabin which had an exposed cargo area. Alternately, it could be ordered with only a windshield and side wing windows and a canvas top. (Most of the military versions were equipped in this fashion). A fully open-top version was also available and this version was used on sand in Texas oilfields, as well as by the British Commandos of the Royal Marines to carry a L6 Wombat anti-tank weapon.

=== Military use ===
The Snow Trac was used successfully by NATO forces during the Cold War with the USSR. Military units are differentiated from civilian units by utilizing a 24-volt electrical system instead of the civilian 12-volt system. Military units also had the fuel tank moved outside the cabin area and mounted over the left (driver's side) track on the cargo ledge. Many military Snow Tracs were used by NATO forces as well as British Royal Marines forces. Military Snow Tracs were also often equipped with special hooking points so they could be transported quickly to remote regions by being carried under a helicopter without the need for special cargo carriers. The Snow Tracs utilitzed by NATO were later replaced by the four-track amphibious articulated Volvo Bandvagn 202, and those were later replaced by a more evolved Hägglunds Bandvagn 206. The REME Museum at MOD Lyneham in England has a Royal Marines Snow Trac on display as part of its Military Tracked Vehicle collection.

=== Desert use ===
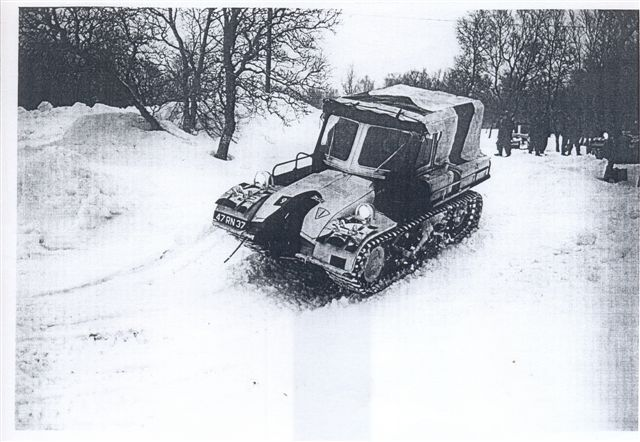
Royal Marines canvas top Snow Trac on NATO patrol in Norway

Snow Tracs were also called Sand Tracs and saw use in the Sahara Desert as over-sand transport vehicles. The crawler track design was well suited for either sand or snow use but was not generally suitable for rocky all-terrain use. The track required loose ground to properly function so it was able to work equally well on gravel, sand, snow, or other loose material like tall grass. Because of their ability to be used in many conditions and climates, the Snow Trac was used worldwide and still is in use today by emergency organizations and some commercial enterprises, although large utilities no longer use Snow Tracs.

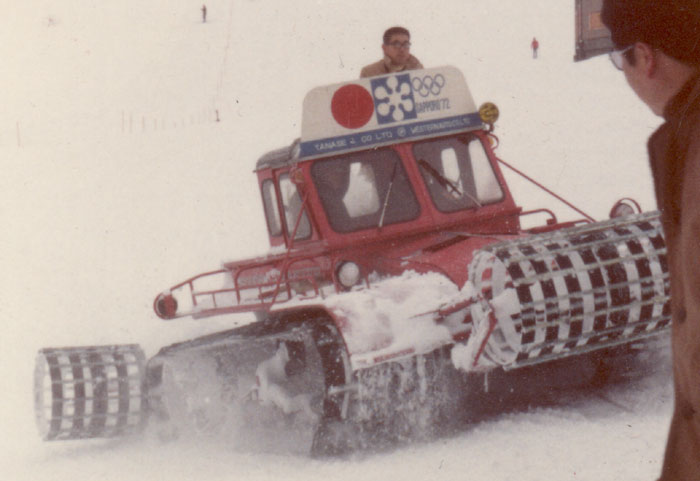
Snow Master version utilized as a ski slope groomer at the Sapporo Olympic games

=== Industrial ===
An industrial version of the Snow Trac was called a Trac Master, and later renamed a Snow Master. The Trac/Snow Master was equipped with a longer and wider track that made it more suitable for the deepest soft snow conditions. Optional hydraulic implements were available for the Trac/Snow Masters for grooming ski trails. Implements for grooming were capable of being mounted on both the front and the rear of the Snow Master and were powered by an auxiliary hydraulic pump that was an option on the Snow Master units.

Shipping records show that Japan was a popular destination for Snow Masters and many are still in use by private owners in the northern regions of Japan. Snow Trac and Snow Master units were used during the 1972 Winter Olympics in Sapporo, Japan as trail groomers and for transportation.

== Production ==
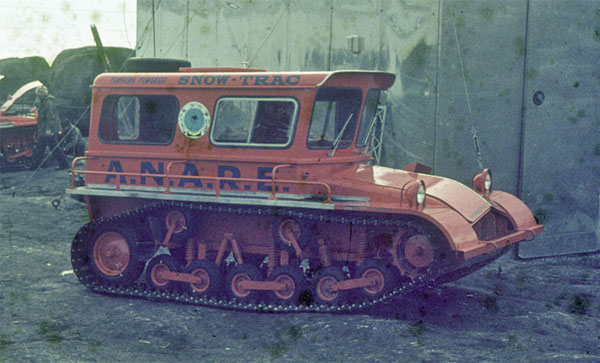
Porsche Snow Trac with custom cabin designed for Antarctic use.

The Swedish made Aktiv Snow Trac of which approximately 2265 were manufactured in Sweden between 1957 and 1981. Production of the Snow Trac ceased when VW stopped European production of the engines that were used to power these vehicles. Additional vehicles were manufactured in Scotland bringing the total to over 2300 units produced.

Numerous accounts from Antarctica related successful use of the Snow Trac by research organizations such as ANARE in Antarctica. Snow Tracs were used at all major Antarctica research bases by numerous government research bodies and several examples now reside in museums with Antarctic research exhibits.

== Snow Trac toys ==
So popular and unique was the Snow Trac that a line of toys from Matchbox was introduced. Lesney MATCHBOX of England made 3 different versions of the Aktiv Fischer Snow Trac ST4. All were very similar in appearance, two of them used the same molds. All of the Matchbox toys are modeled after the two large wheel Aktiv Snow Trac; this version has two large rubber tires, one at the rear, and the third about 24" aft of the drive sprocket. Lesney designated their toy #35 in the Matchbox series.

- Version 1 had the words SNOW TRAC embossed in the sides of the tractor
- Version 2 had no identification of the Snow Trac at all with smooth sides
- Version 3 had white decals reading SNOW TRAC on the smooth sides

Matchbox also produced a very limited run of cardboard puzzles featuring agricultural equipment and vehicles, one such puzzle featured the Snow Trac.

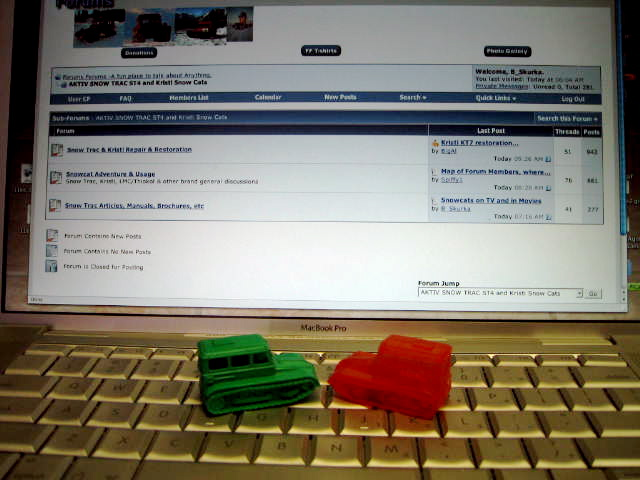
R&L Cereal toy Snow Trac toys

In 1967, a toy maker in Melbourne, Australia, produced a snap together model kit of the Snow Trac. The company, Rosenhahn & Lipmann, more commonly referred to as R&L, specialised in the manufacture of cereal premiums. The Snow Trac was part of their "Polar Base" series that took inspiration from the ANARE activities in Antarctica. The toys were issued as a free cereal premium inside boxes of cereal in Australia by the Kellogg Company. They may have also been issued as a cereal premium in the USA. They were produced in at least five colours and built up into a model 45 mm in length. In 1975, R&L produced a large order of toys for use by Aurora in the USA. The Snap-A-Roos series by Aurora, included an "Antarctic Explorers" box set that contained the Snow Trac model.

== See also ==
- Arctic Cat
- Bombardier Snowcat & Snowmobile manufacturer
- KRISTI snowcat
- Logan Machine Company
- Moto-Ski
- Sisu Nasu
- Sno-Cat
- Snow coach
- Snow grooming
- Snowmobiles
- The Shining Stanley Kubrick movie featuring a Snow Trac and a Thiokol Imp
