= Aktiv Grizzly =

Swedish snowmobile

The Aktiv Grizzly was a dual-track snowmobile made by Aktiv Maskin Östersund AB in Sweden from 1979 to 1991. The Grizzly is still recognized as one of the best dual-track snowmobiles in the world. The snowmobile's tracks covered almost one square meter, making it well suited for use in deep snow. Similar dual-track snowmobiles include Bombardiers Ski-Doo Alpine, Ski-Doo Alpine 2 and Ockelbo 8000. Currently two dual-track snowmobile are in production, one in Russia under the name "Buran" and one in Italy, "Alpina Sherpa".

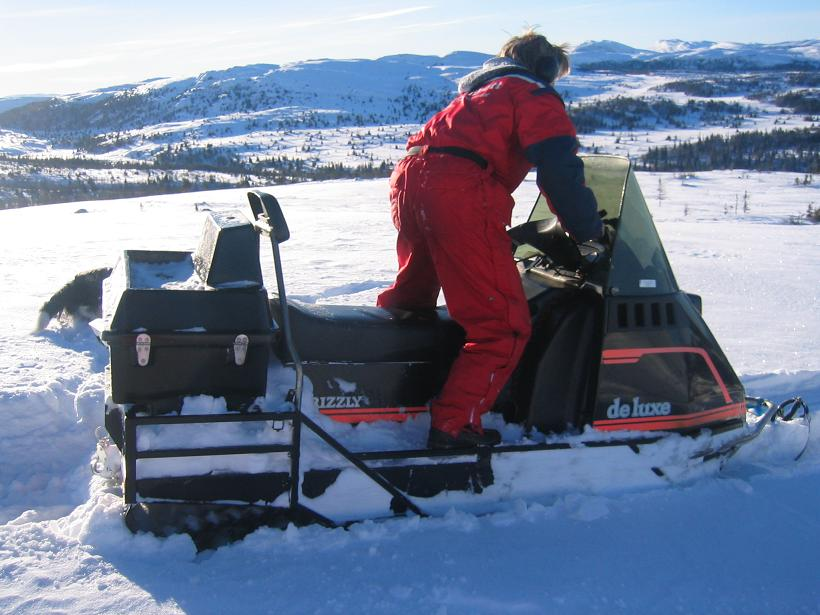
Aktiv Grizzly de luxe, 1988

Aktiv started making tracked vehicles 1957 with the Snow Trac, a small personal snowcat roughly the size of a compact car. The company started making small snowmobiles in 1973 after purchasing the Snö-Tric brand. The first dual-track snowmobiles that Aktiv made were the Snö-Tric Blå 75- and SC 20/2 75-.

The Grizzly was also sold under license by Polaris Industries as the "Polaris Grizzly de luxe". This version had a Fuji 440 ccm engine. Also the Finnish company Winha sold early models of Grizzlies produced in 1982 and 1983 under their own brand name. Winha Grizzlies had either a traditional or flexible joint-bogie chassis, and either an Artic Spirit AB 50, A3 or Fuji EC 44-2PM-3000 engine.

== Specifications ==
The Grizzly snowmobile was equipped with dual 38 x 384 cm tracks and a single front ski. Dual front skis were available for the XP model. The engine was a 497 ccm Rotax 503 Scandinavia, which produced 38 HP (28 kW) at the snowmobile's maximum RPM of 5700. In the mid 80's, the Grizzly switched from the traditional wheel-based chassis to a flexible joint-bogie, which made the ride smoother and the passability much better. The carburetor was a VM 32, supplied by Mikuni. De luxe models of earlier Grizzlies had a transmission with one forward and one reverse gear. The last model produced (XP, 1989–1991) had two forward speeds.

Overall length	309 cm
Overall width	97 cm
Overall height	141 cm
Overall weight	375/345 kg
Motor make	Rotax
Motor type	503 Scandinavia (Alpine)
Number of cylinders	2
Displacement	497 ccm
Bore	72 mm
Stroke	62 mm
HP(kW) @ 5700 RPM	38(28)
Max. RPM	5700
Fuel lubrication	2 Stroke Oil 50:1 (2%)
Cooling System	Axial Fan
Idle RPM	2100
Ignition/Generator	CDI 12V/140W
Spark Plug	NGK B7ES, B8ES or similar
Spark gap	0,5 mm
Carburettor	1x Mikuni VM 32
Fuel	Unleaded Petrol, 90 Oc. or better
Engine Variator	Polaris/AKTIV
Secondary Variator	Polaris/AKTIV
Gear Exchange	3,0:1 - 1:1
Transmission (De Luxe)	FWD 3,07:1 / REV 4,82:1

== Links and resources ==
- Skoterportalen Grizzly Page (Swedish)
- Red Cross in Norway are still using Grizzly
- David's Vintage Snowmobile Page on Aktiv Grizzly
