= Aktiv =

Former Swedish vehicle manufacturer

Aktiv was a trademark of Swedish Aktiv Maskin Östersund ltd. The company started producing agriculture machines and tracked vehicles. It sold its agriculture division to Electrolux and changed its focus to tracked vehicles in 1980. The company went out of business in 1991.

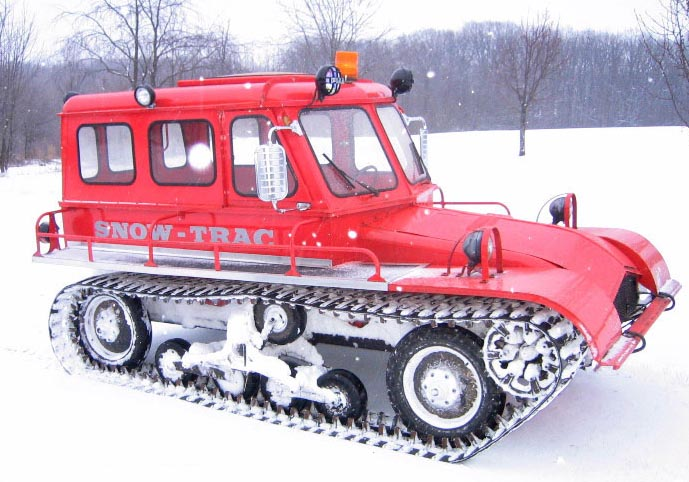
VW powered Snow Trac, 54hp, 4 manual speed transmission

Aktiv started making tracked vehicles in 1957 when they started making Snow Trac, a small personal Snowcat roughly the size of a modern compact car. Aktiv started making small snowmobiles in 1973 when they bought the Snö-Tric brand. The first dual-Trac snowmobile made by Aktiv was Snö-Tric Blå 75- and SC 20/2 75-.

== Snowmobiles ==
- Sno-Tric Gul 73-
- Sno-Tric Röd 73-
- Sno-Tric Blå 75- (dual-track snowmobile)
- SC 20/2 75- (dual-track snowmobile)
- Aktiv 600 75-
- Aktiv Grizzly (dual-track snowmobile)
  - Aktiv Grizzly De Luxe 82-89
  - Aktiv Grizzly XP 89-91
- Aktiv Panther
- Aktiv Karibo
- Aktiv Alaska
