= Snow coach =

Vehicle specialized for snowy or icy conditions

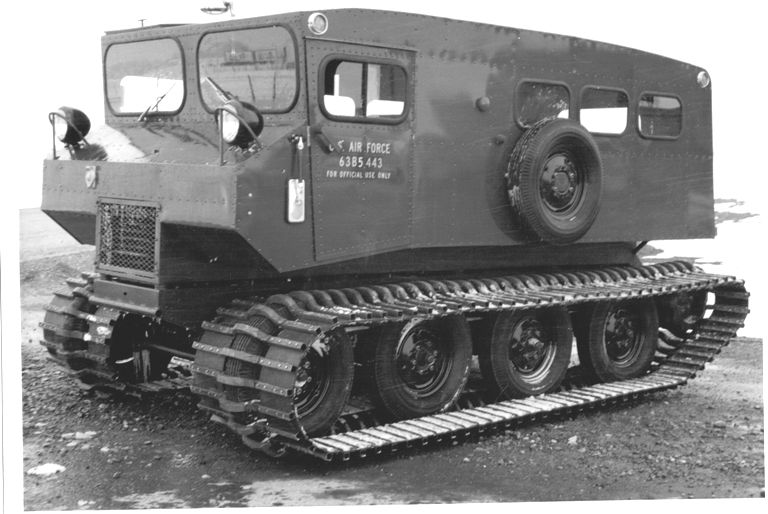
1963 10-passenger Thiokol 601 operated by the USAF

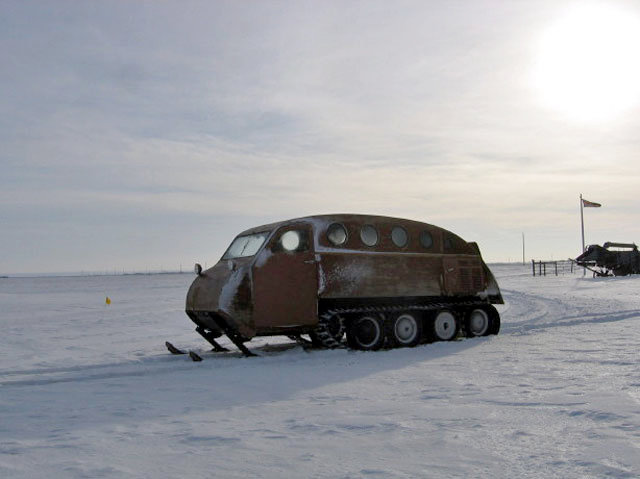
Early-style, 12-passenger snow coach made by Bombardier of Canada

A snow coach is a specialized passenger transport vehicle designed to operate over snow or ice, similar to a large, multi-passenger snowcat equipped with bus-style seating. These vehicles may have multiple sets of massive, low-pressure tires, or they may have tracks. Snow coaches may seat ten or more passengers and are often used for sightseeing tours or over-snow transportation.

== History ==
An early example of a snow coach was the Snow Bus built by Bombardier in Quebec, Canada. It was equipped with front skis and rear tracks and typically could seat 12 passengers. Alternatively, the front skis could be removed and replaced with front wheels. There are documented uses of the Bombardier Snow Bus as a school bus, for mail delivery, and as emergency vehicles. They were also used for tours and transportation in snowbound areas.

In the early 1960s, Thiokol produced the 601 series snowcats, often configured to carry ten passengers. While not a tour bus type snow coach, these found utility with the United States Air Force and private industry.

== Terra Bus ==
The Terra Bus wheeled vehicle is one of the few snow-coach-type vehicles currently produced. It is an all-wheel-drive, three-axle, off-road bus specially constructed for Arctic climates by the Canadian speciality vehicle manufacturer Foremost, based in Calgary.

The Terra Bus can transport up to 56 passengers. The vehicle has six extra-large, low-pressure tires typically filled to 30 pounds per square inch (210 kPa). One Modified Terra Bus can be found transporting passengers at the Antarctic research station, McMurdo Station. Brewster Co. operates twenty-two unmodified Terra Buses for their Ice Explorer tour at the Columbia Icefield and Jasper National Park.

=== Specifications ===
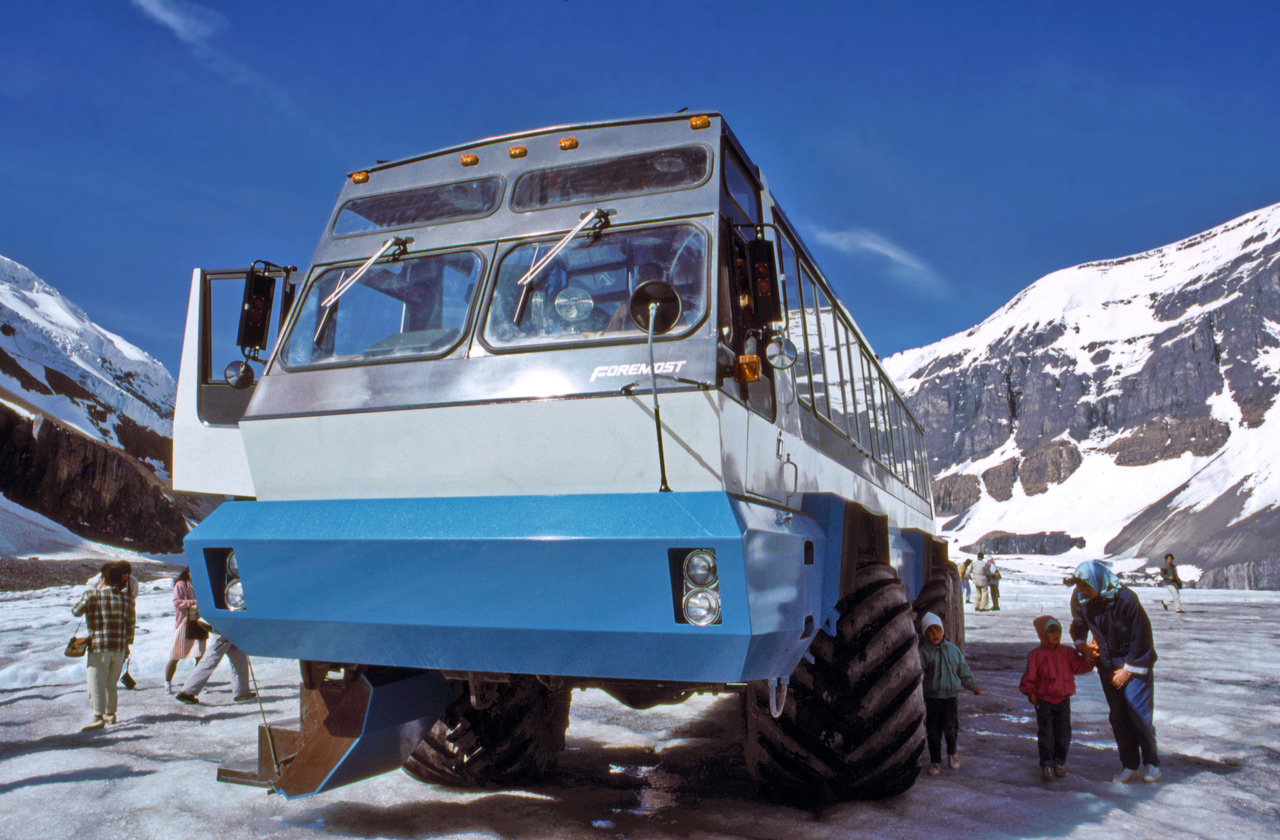
Foremost Terra Bus at Athabasca Glacier in the 1980s

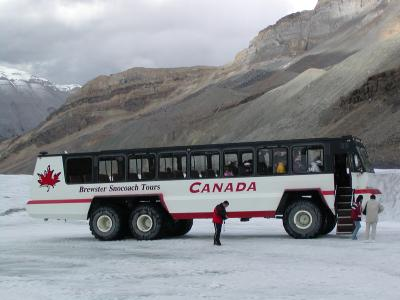
A Terra Bus on the Athabasca Glacier

==== Dimensions ====
- Length: 14.89 metres (48.9 ft)
- Height: 3.96 metres (13.0 ft)
- Weight:
  - Curb weight: 24.95 tonnes
  - Maximum gross vehicle weight: 29.94 tonnes (33 Tons)

==== Performance ====
- Engine:
  - Type: Detroit Diesel Series 50
  - Power: 250 hp (187 kW) at 2100 rpm
  - Transmission: Clark 34600 Series Power Shift
- Top speed: 40 kilometres per hour (25 mph), 18 kilometres per hour (11 mph) on the Athabasca Glacier
- Turning radius: 21.9 metres (72 ft)

==== Operators ====
- United States Antarctic Program
- Brewster co. Tours

== Uses ==
Snowcoaches are a popular mode of transportation for tourists in areas such as Yellowstone Park in the United States and the Columbia Icefield in Jasper National Park, Canada.

Snowcoaches can be outfitted with a rubber track or a ski system (replacing tires). Often called Mattracks, these rubber track systems can travel over thinner snow depths and even bare road patches without tearing up roadways. Metal-based ski systems can cause more damage or get stuck when travelling over snow-free patches. Subsequently, certain roads may be restricted to just Mattrack-equipped snow coaches based on road conditions.

== Gallery ==
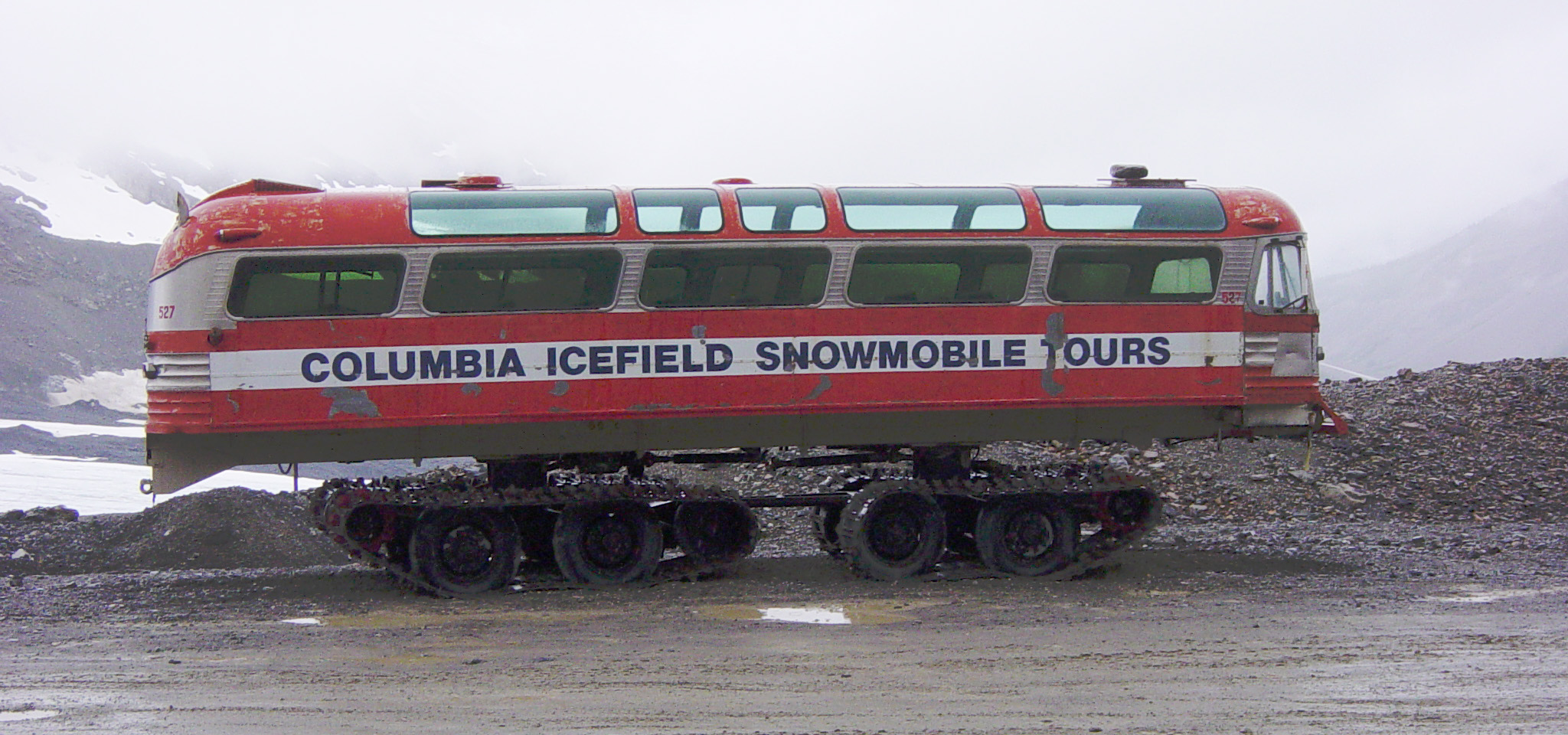
A road coach conversion, known as a "Shake and Bake"

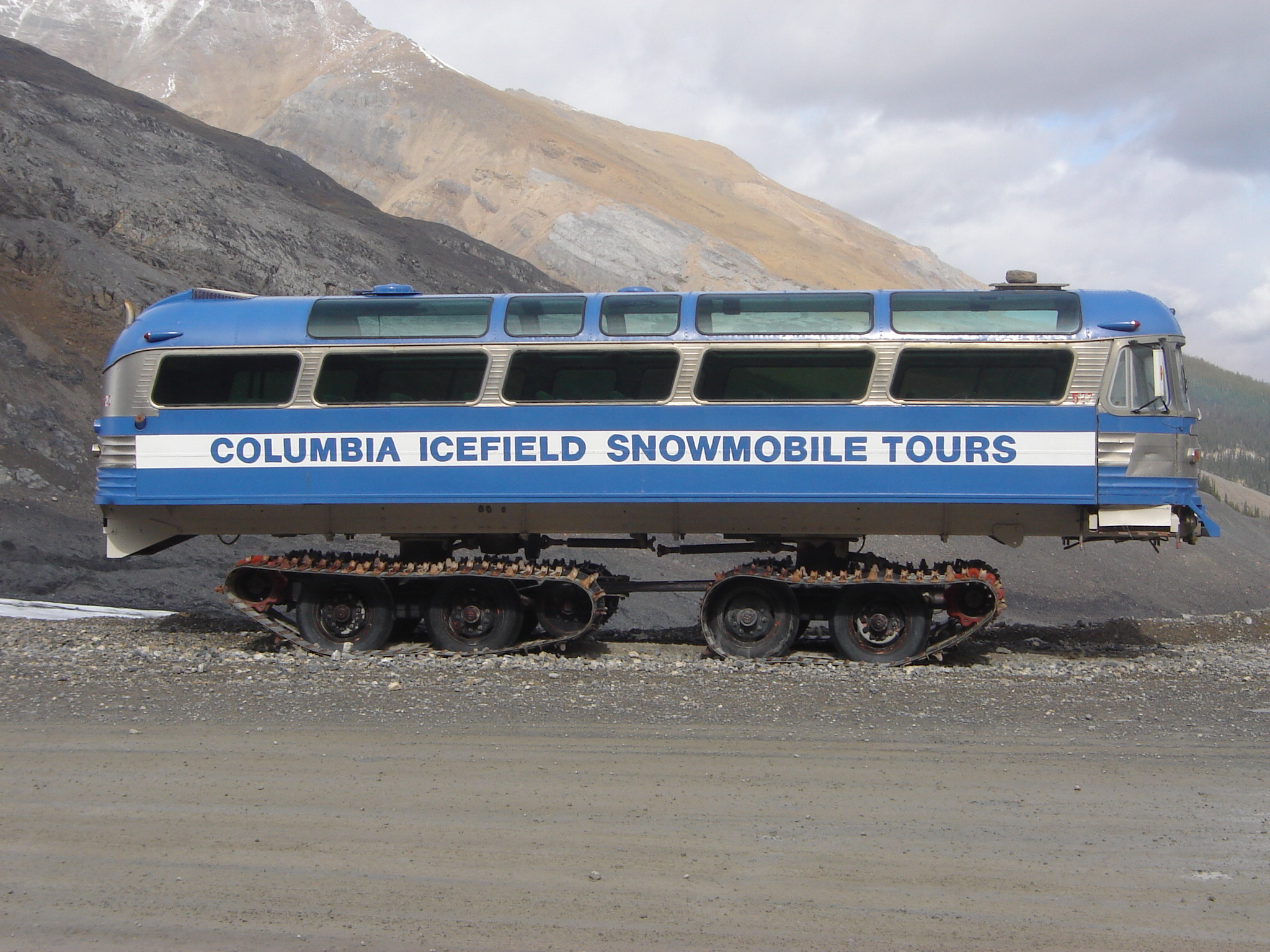
A "Shake and Bake"

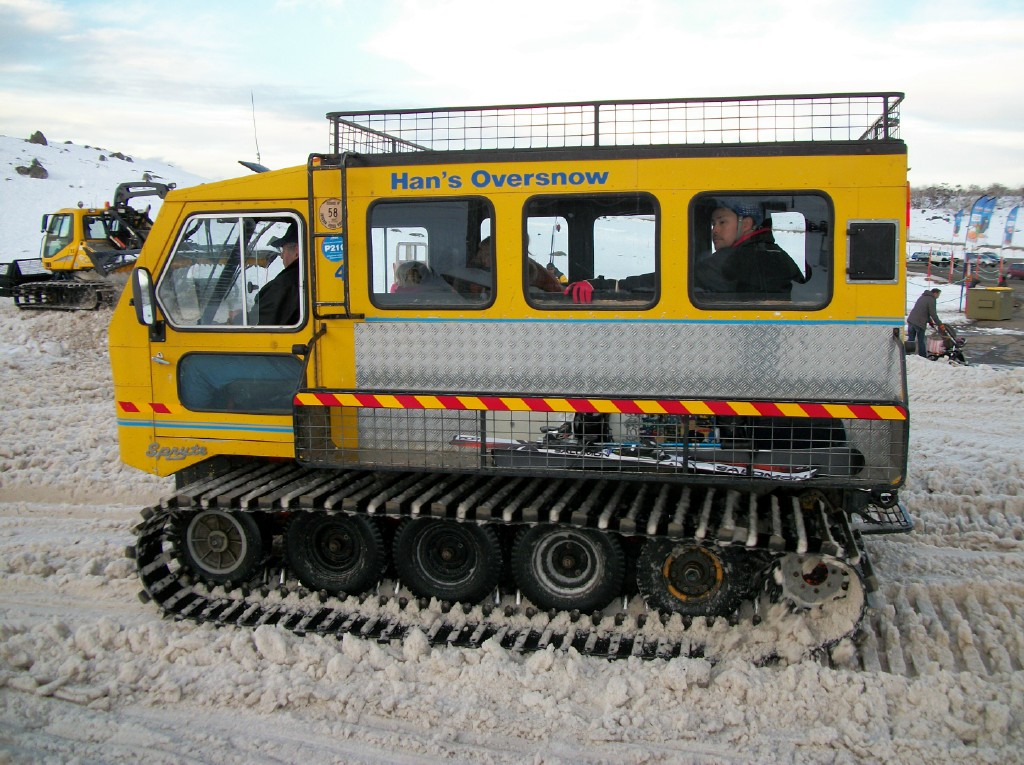
Perisher, Australia

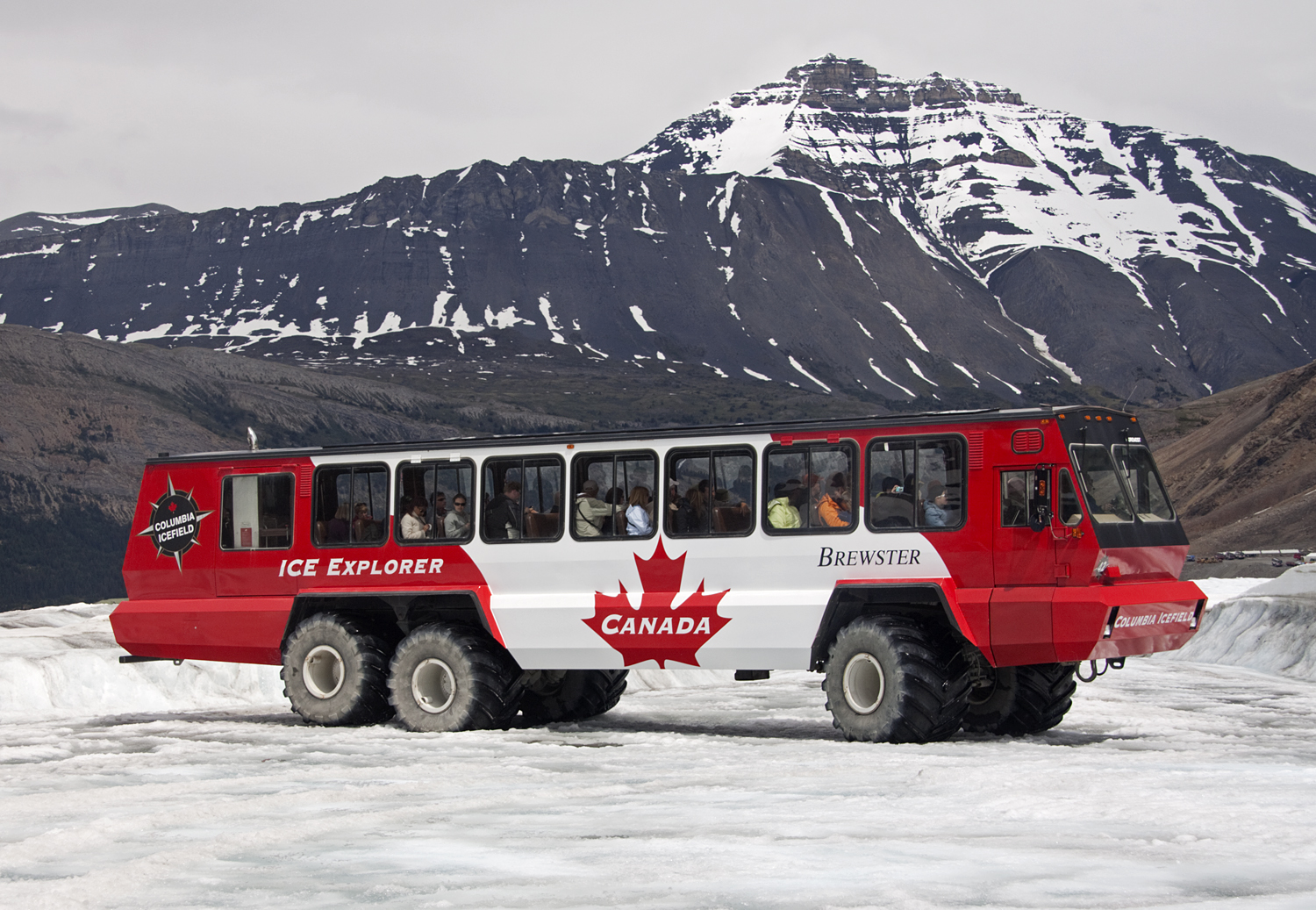
Athabasca Glacier, Alberta, Canada

== See also ==
- Antarctic Snow Cruiser
- Bombardier Inc.
- Bombardier Recreational Products
- Kharkovchanka
- Logan Machine Company
- Sno-Cat
- Snowmobile
- Snow Trac
- Thiokol
