= Logan Machine Company =

Former American snowcat manufacturer

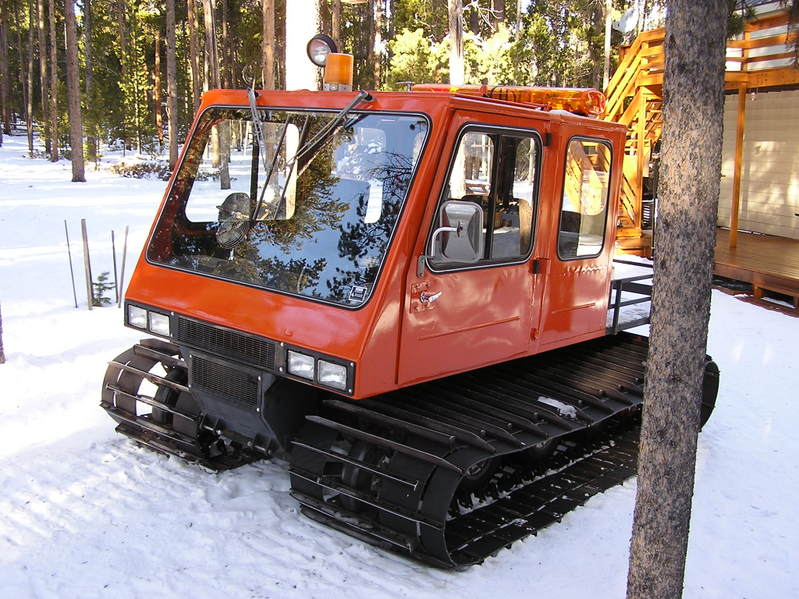
LMC 1500

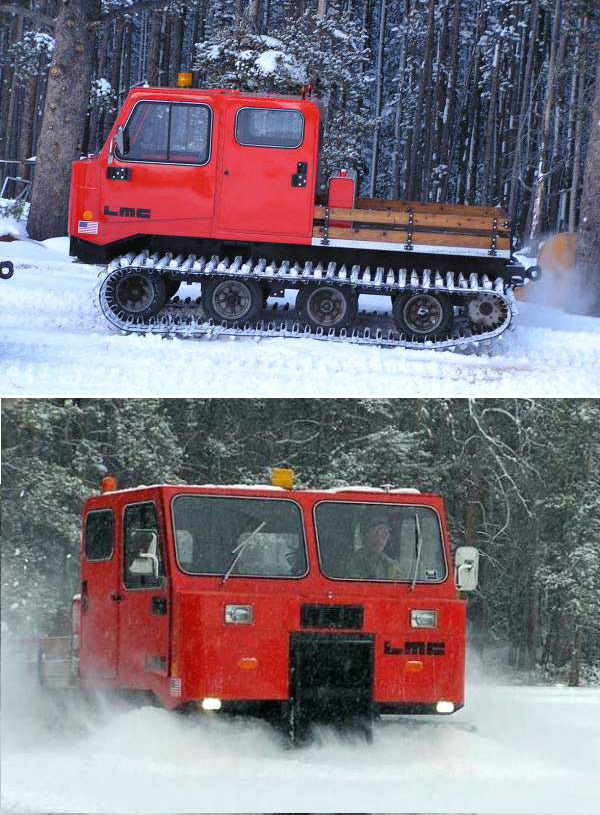
LMC 1200

Logan Manufacturing Company was a US manufacturer of snowcats that ceased operation in 2000. LMC is both the tradename (brand name) and an initialism.

The company's earliest history started with a prototype tracked snow vehicle built in 1948 by engineers Roy France and Emmett Devine, of the Utah Scientific Foundation at Utah State University in Logan, Utah. After building a few more prototypes, series production began in 1950 under the Frandee Sno-Shu brand. In 1961, Utah Scientific Foundation sold the snow vehicle business to the Thiokol Corporation, with the Frandee Sno-Shu name being retired in favor of the Thiokol brand on the company's products. Manufacturing moved out of a workshop on the Utah State University campus to a new facility in Logan.

During the mid 1970s, Thiokol adopted a new strategy of divesting ancillary businesses in order to focus on its core rocket and missile operations, and the snow cat business division was earmarked for sale.

In 1978, John DeLorean arranged to borrow $8.5 million from Lotus Cars founder Colin Chapman, paid through a holding company in Panama owned by the two men, called General Products Development Services Inc., and used it to acquire the Thiokol snowcat division. Following the sale, the business was reorganized as DeLorean Manufacturing Company, using the DMC brand on its products. Under DeLorean, DMC diversified into the production of airport tugs in the early 1980s, and also began contract manufacturing of metal components for home exercise machines.

In the fall of 1982, several senior managers of DeLorean Manufacturing, with financing from Citibank, offered to buy the company from John DeLorean for $19 million, but were rebuffed.

After John DeLorean's more famous business, DeLorean Motor Company, collapsed in bankruptcy in late 1982, DeLorean Manufacturing was renamed Logan Manufacturing Company, doing business under the LMC brand, in an effort to distance it from DeLorean himself and his other troubles.

Both DMC and LMC snowcats were available in numerous models and were available for use grooming ski-slopes, transporting work crews, and for snowmobile snow grooming. Many are still in commercial use today. Popular production snowcats manufactured by Thiokol were carried over almost through DMC and LMC's product lines and the IMP, Super IMP and Spryte models are still in use today and often favored by private snowcat owners for back country transportation uses.

Other brands that competed with DMC and LMC included the Tucker Sno-Cat and Bombardier snowcats. DeLorean sold his shares to an investment group in 1993, by that time several snowcat brands had ceased operation due to market factors, among them the Snow Trac and Kristi.

The final settlement of the DeLorean Motor Company bankruptcy case in 1987, which also involved John DeLorean's personal bankruptcy, left Mr. DeLorean in full control of Logan Manufacturing, as his largest remaining asset, then valued by the courts at around $28 million.

In January 1993, John DeLorean closed on the sale of Logan Manufacturing to an investment consortium headed by New York businessman Paul Wallace and former Senator John V. Tunney of California, at a price of around $13 million. At that time, LMC was reporting annual sales of $20 million, and had 200 employees operating out of a 100,000 square foot facility on 20 acres, with an annual payroll of $4 million.

However, after several years of financial difficulties during the 1990s, Logan Manufacturing Company filed for bankruptcy in April 2000, and ceased operations. The company's spare parts inventories, blueprints, and intellectual property was purchased by Peterson Equipment Company, a new and used snowcat dealership and repair shop, based in Hyde Park, Utah.

== See also ==
- The Shining (film) Stanley Kubrick movie featuring a Snow Trac & Thiokol Imp
