= Kristi Company =

Vehicle designed for snowy terrain

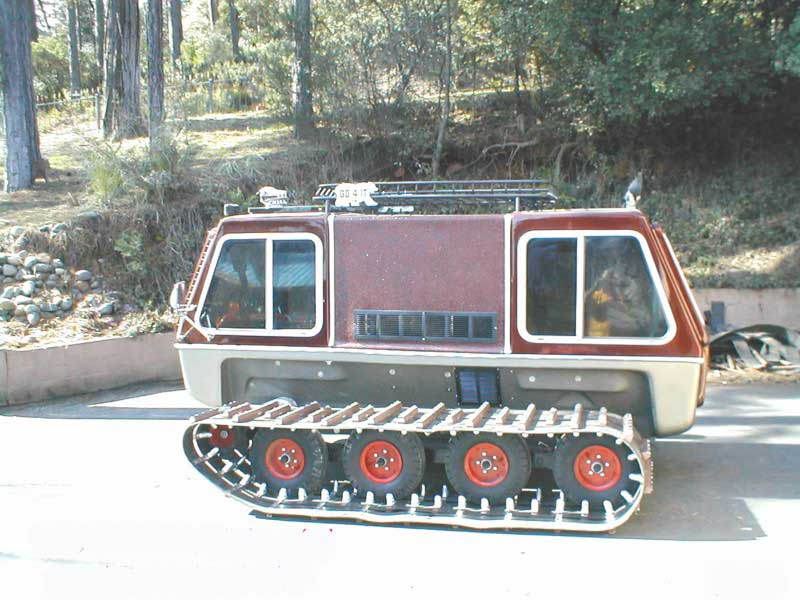
Kristi KT-7, #004, only known successful KT7 produced, shown in restored condition

Kristi snowcats were 1950s/1960s tracked vehicles suitable for snow and other terrain and produced originally in Colorado and then later in Washington.

== Propeller drive snowplane ==
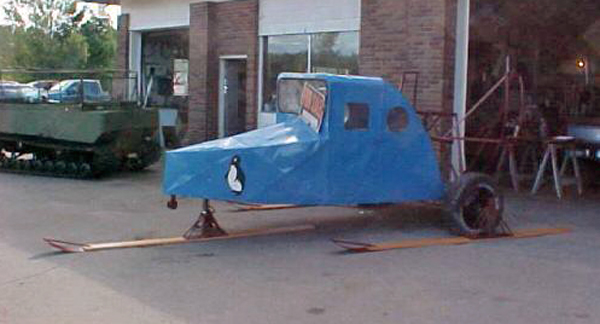
Homebuilt snowplane from the 1930s pre-dating the Kristi concept snowplane illustrating traditional rigid skis

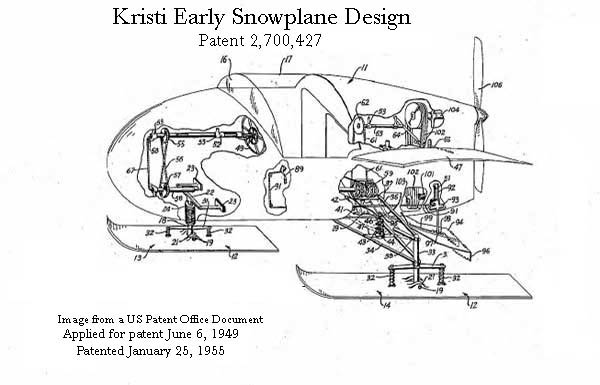
Early drawing showing tilting concept on a snowplane prior to the switch to snowcat construction

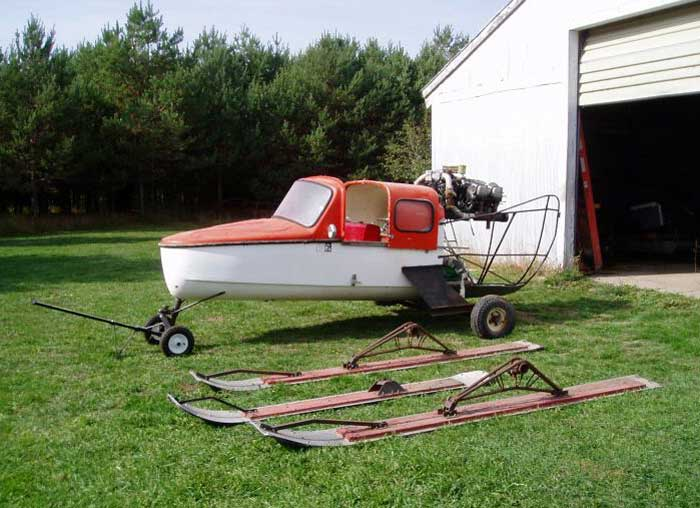
1963 Polaris snowplane, like other non-Kristi designs, did not use the "Christie" ski action, this results in the rear skis skidding across the snow surface through turns

The original Kristi snowplanes were very similar to the earlier Russian Aerosledges which were developed as early as World War I. The Kristi design was more advanced than the Aerosledges, and utilized adjustable ski action to perform higher speed turns and received a patent for its design in 1955.

According to the introduction, contained in the operators manual: "The development of the Kristi snow vehicles began in early 1947 in the form of a very unusual snow plane. This propeller driven vehicle utilized a control by which the operator could tilt the machine from side to side, in effect raising one ski and lowering the other to negotiate up to 45-degree side slopes and permit high-speed turns without skidding. This tilting and edging of skis after the manner of a skier was called "Ski-Action". Since it could do a "Christie" up or down hill, the trade name "Kristi" was adopted."

The Kristi snowplane featured a revolutionary change in ski handling concepts. As stated in the manual, the design was inspired by snow skiers who angled their skis to effect a turn (this angling of skis is called a Christie) and it allows for both higher speed turns and greater control. The theoretical advantage of the Kristi system in a snowplane would make for safer and faster turns on frozen lakes. The photos of snowplanes clearly show stationary mounted rear skis and a turning front ski, the Kristi design improved on this design by allowing the skis to carve their edges into the snow as traditional snowplanes's rear skis will skid laterally during a turn.

The major advancement of the Kristi tilt ski system apparently made no impact on the commercial or amateur snowplane industry as it did not appear to be used in practical application. Perhaps because of the mechanical complexity of the original design, no snowplanes are known to exist that employ the "Christi Ski Action" concept. Snowplanes are well suited to travel on frozen lakes and snowcovered fields or roads but are not suitable for use in mountains or on rough ground.

== Track drive snowcat ==
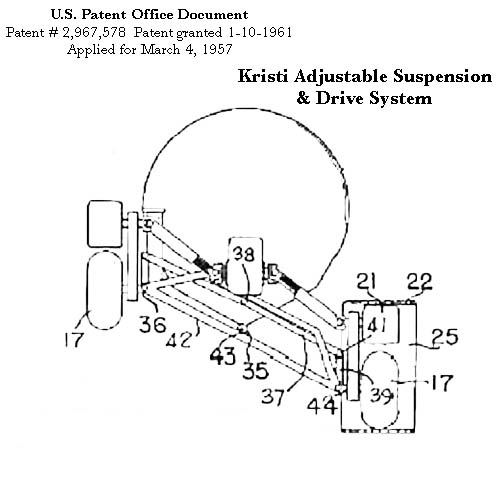
Kristi adjustable track concept

Early in the life of the company, Kristi switched production from snowplanes to snowcats. The Kristi had a unique ability to raise or lower its tracks individually which had the effect of raising one side of the vehicle to keep the vehicle level while crossing side slopes. Further, the front or rear of both tracks could be raised or lowered so the snowcat's cabin could remain level while climbing or descending slopes.

Kristi was commercially built in Colorado. The original Kristi company offered 3 basic models, the KT2, KT3 and KT4. Total production of all the units combined, over the entire 12 year life of the original company's lifespan, was lower than 1 year of production of other commercial snowcats. The company changed ownership and moved to Washington and continued production. Production was always on a small scale, and the products were innovative. The KT7 was designed and produced after the sale of the company and after it moved to Washington. It is possible that additional KT2, KT3 and KT4 units were manufactured by the new owners in Washington state but it is unlikely since the designs had not been substantially upgraded by the time the new owners purchased the company. A slightly smaller version of the KT3 was called the KT2. Both the KT2 and KT3 were powered by Volkswagen air-cooled 4-cylinder engines, it is reported that a small percentage may have been powered by Porsche engines. The KT2 and KT3 shared mechanicals and even shared the same operators manual. The VW engine developed 32 horsepower.

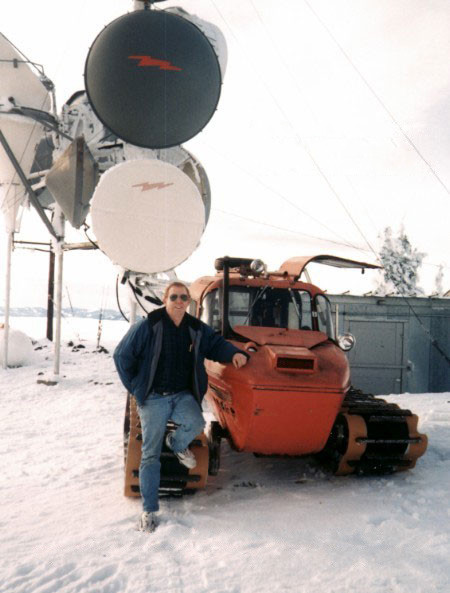
An early KT3, still in commercial use to access mountaintop antenna arrays in need of repair

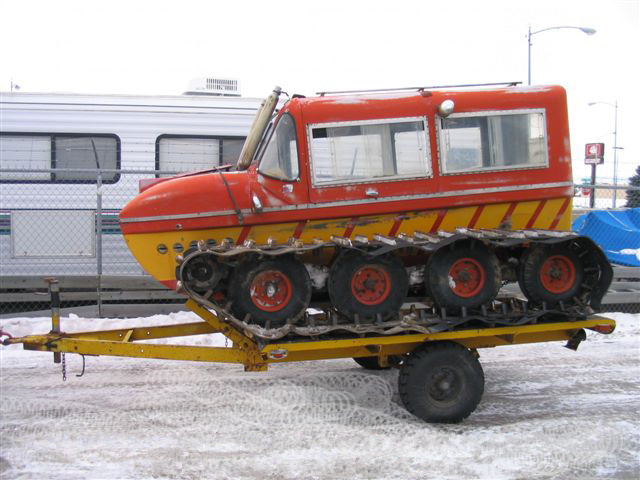
KT3 on a rare Kristi tilt trailer

Kristi also built custom tilt-bed trailers used for hauling the KT3 which used the same tires and wheels on the trailer as on the KT3.

Various different sales brochures make different claims about the transmissions used in the Kristi KT3. It is therefore possible to find a KT3 with either 8 or 9 forward gears, and either 4 or 3 reverse gears. The units with 8 forward/4 reverse had a high-low range ratio of 7:1. All used joystick controls in a V-shaped arrangement that were centered under tachometer.

Specifications from the sales brochure for the Kristi KT3 stated that it was 11' long, 7'4" wide and had a height of 5'9" with an empty weight of 2095 pounds. The KT3 was configured for 5 passengers and imparted 0.46 PSI of pressure onto the snow. It had a maximum cargo/passenger capacity of 1,500 pounds and a towing capacity of 2000 pounds. With a fuel capacity of 20 gallons of gasoline, it claims 15 to 18 hours of operating time and a top speed of 20 mph.

The KT3 sales brochure claimed the ability to climb a 100% grade with full load when not on the snow. It claimed the ability to climb a 70% grade in snow conditions with a full load and in soft snow it claims the ability to traverse a side slope with a 60% grade. The Kristi action adjustable track suspension will hold the cabin level on slopes with up to a 25% grade.

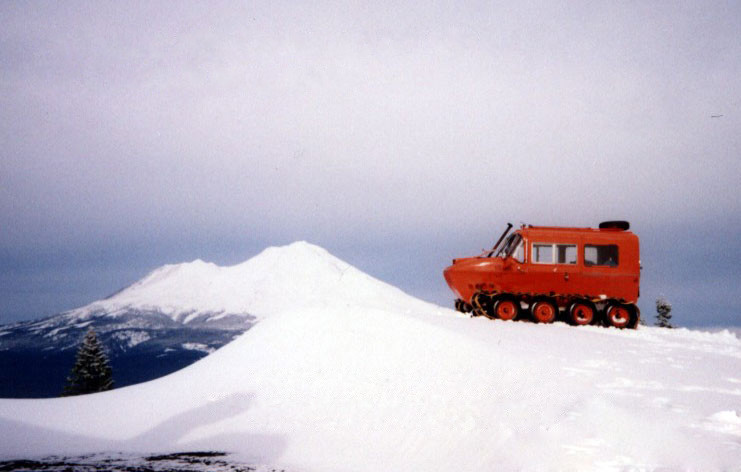
KT3 pictured with Mt. Bradley in the background

A larger Kristi snowcat was produced and designated the KT4 and the KT4a. The KT4 had a fully enclosed fiberglass body while the KT4a was an open version and "a" designated that it was an amphibious unit capable of floating and crossing streams or ponds. The Kristi KT4a's prototype has been referred to as the "Water Walker" due to its amphibious capabilities. The KT4 and KT4a units are very rare and less than 5 are known to exist of a total production that was probably under 20. The KT4 was powered by a Chevrolet Corvair 6-cylinder gasoline engine.

A prototype model built on a modified Chevrolet 1/2-ton pick-up truck frame was built and designated the KWT. This unit still exists and is in storage. The KWT, according to the prototype's announcement pre-sales brochure, was built for ranchers and farmers as a heavy-duty all-terrain vehicle capable of hauling and towing loads into remote snowbound locations. It also was designed to be capable to be driven on the road with the tracks removed. The KWT never reached the production. The engine specified was to be a 250-cubic-inch, or optionally a 292-cubic-inch, 6-cylinder gasoline powered, Chevrolet engine. A brochure announces it would use conventional steering when driven as a wheeled vehicle but does not indicate how it would steer as a tracked vehicle. This prototype vehicle still exists and is currently unused and in storage and owned by a private antique vehicle collector.

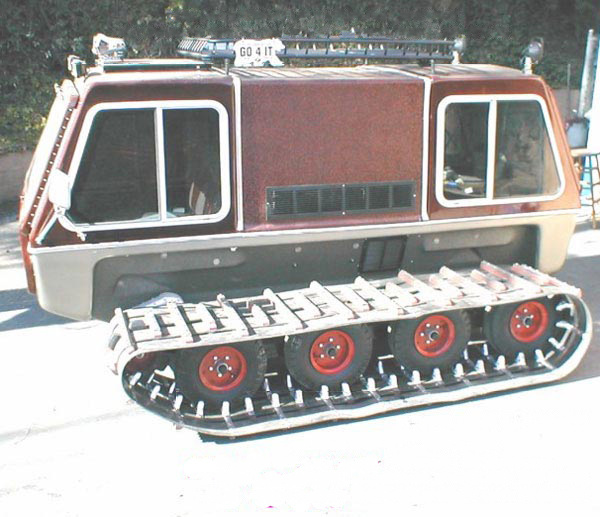
Yetti Edition Kristi KT7 after 1+ year restoration

== Washington relocation and the KT7 ==
Kristi eventually changed ownership and moved to Washington state. The later model KT3s were equipped with a 53 hp VW engine, or alternately with a Porsche engine. The top speeds of the KT3 were 20 mph when powered by the VW engine, and 25 mph when powered by the Porsche engine. Kristi of Washington developed a new model called the KT7 snowcat, The most refined and last produced of the Kristi snowcats was the KT7, of which only 4 were built and only 1 was successful: #004. The KT7 used a Ford Anglia gasoline engine controlled by governor over hydrostatic Vickers drive with body tilt. The industrial engine has a 104 cu.in V-4 configuration generating 80 hp. While never produced, the brochure also offered a V-6, 171 cu.in. engine as an option. The engine was mounted in the middle of the snowcat with the driver and front passenger forward, and the rear passengers aft, facing the rear. There were access doors on either end of the KT7 and the rear and the front look nearly identical save for the headlamps. An early original brochure announcing the KT7 actually shows its designation as a KT3a and calls it an "improved KT3" but the production brochure has it designated as the KT7. The KT7 was tested by the FAA for use in Alaska but failed to achieve a 20 mph speed requirement; the sales brochure claims a 15 to 25 mph speed "depending on transmission/engine options." Photos of the only known restored (by Allen Huston) KT7 Yetti are posted on this page, this unit is the last KT7 produced and is serial #002 owned and preserved by Marco Johnson of Bellingham, Washington, it is also the only unit that was modestly successful.

According to an original sales brochure, specifications for the KT7 indicate it was 12'1" long, was 8'2" wide to the outside of the tracks, and had a body width of 4'1" and a height of 5'6" tall with the body in the lowered position and 6'4" tall with the body in the raised position. Ground clearance in the raised position is 16" and the weight is 3225# with a rated load of 1800#. Climbing performance is "Up to 100% depending on the terrain surface conditions."

== Demise ==
Kristi was technically interesting, but the company failed to produce quantities of snowcats to compete with other North American or European snowcat manufacturers. The FAA test failure doomed the KT7, and ultimately lead to the demise of the company in the early 1970s. While Kristi was commercially unsuccessful, it did surpass other companies that only developed "snowplanes", largely because tracked vehicles are more suitable for uneven terrain.

== See also ==
- Bombardier
- Logan Machine Company
- Snow coach
- Snowcat
- Snowmobiles
