= Bandvagn 202 =

Volvo BM Bandvagn 202 (Bv 202)
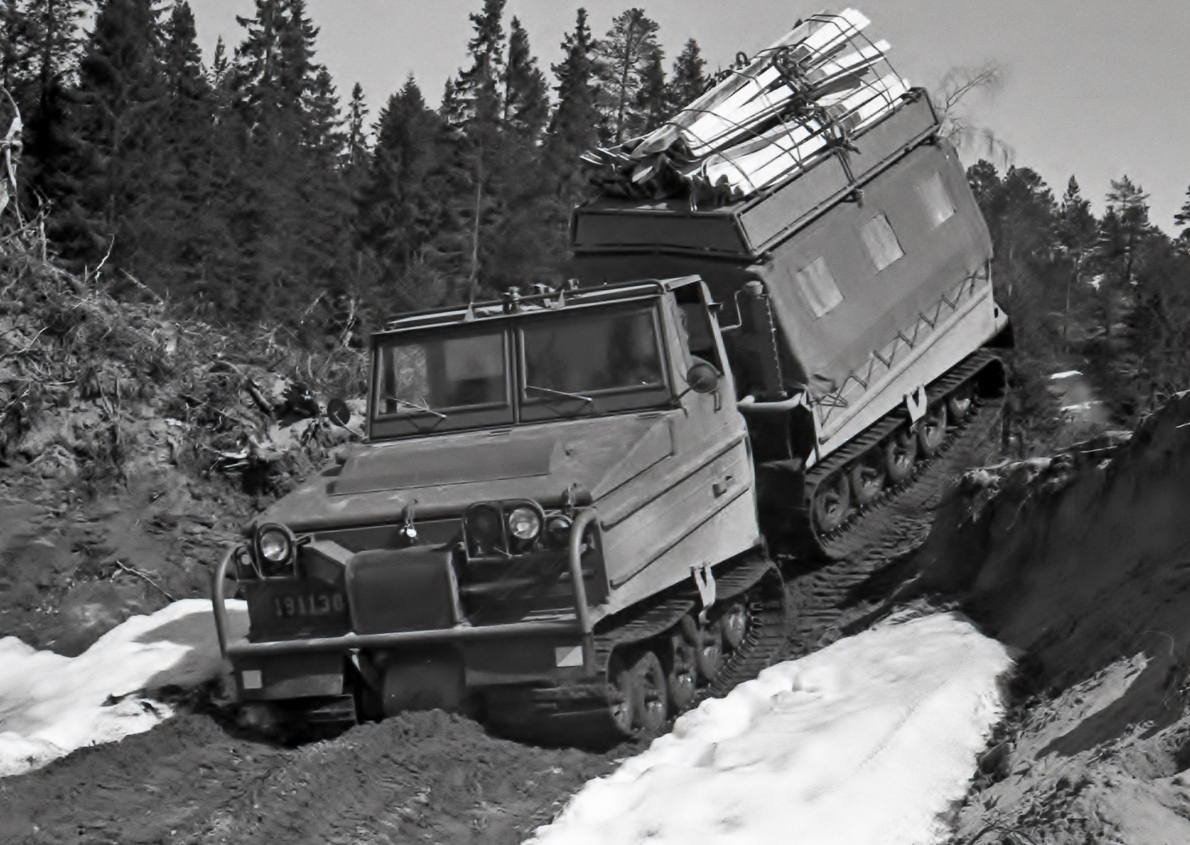
- Bandvagn 202 from Västernorrlands regemente (I 21), carrying skis on the rear roof
- Type: Tracked frame-steered vehicle
- Place of origin: Sweden

Service history
- Used by: See operators

Production history
- Designed: 1957-1961
- Manufacturer: Bolinder-Munktell
- Produced: 1964–1981
- No. built: 1 700
- Variants: mk I, mkII, see variants

Specifications
- Mass: 2,900 kg (6,400 lb)
- Length: 6.175 m (20 ft 3.1 in)
- Width: 1.8 m (5 ft 11 in)
- Height: 2.2 m (7 ft 3 in)
- Crew: Driver + 1 passenger (front car)
- Passengers: 8 passengers (rear car)
- Secondary armament: Ksp58 machine gun on pintle mount
- Engine: Volvo B18B in mkI, mkII B20B; 82.5 hp/97 hp
- Payload capacity: 800 kg (in terrain).
- Drive: tracked, with 0.1 kg/cm^{2} ground pressure
- Transmission: mkI VOLVO M 42, mkII ZF
- Fuel capacity: 78 litres
- Operational range: 200 km
- Maximum speed: 39 km/h (24 mph) (roads); 5 km/h (3.1 mph) (water)
- Steering system: Articulated frame-steering, mkI mechanical hydraulic, mkII orbitrol hydraulic

Bandvagn 202 (Bv 202) is an amphibious oversnow tracked articulated, all-terrain vehicle developed by Bolinder-Munktell, a subsidiary of Volvo, for the Swedish Army in the early 1960s.

== Description ==
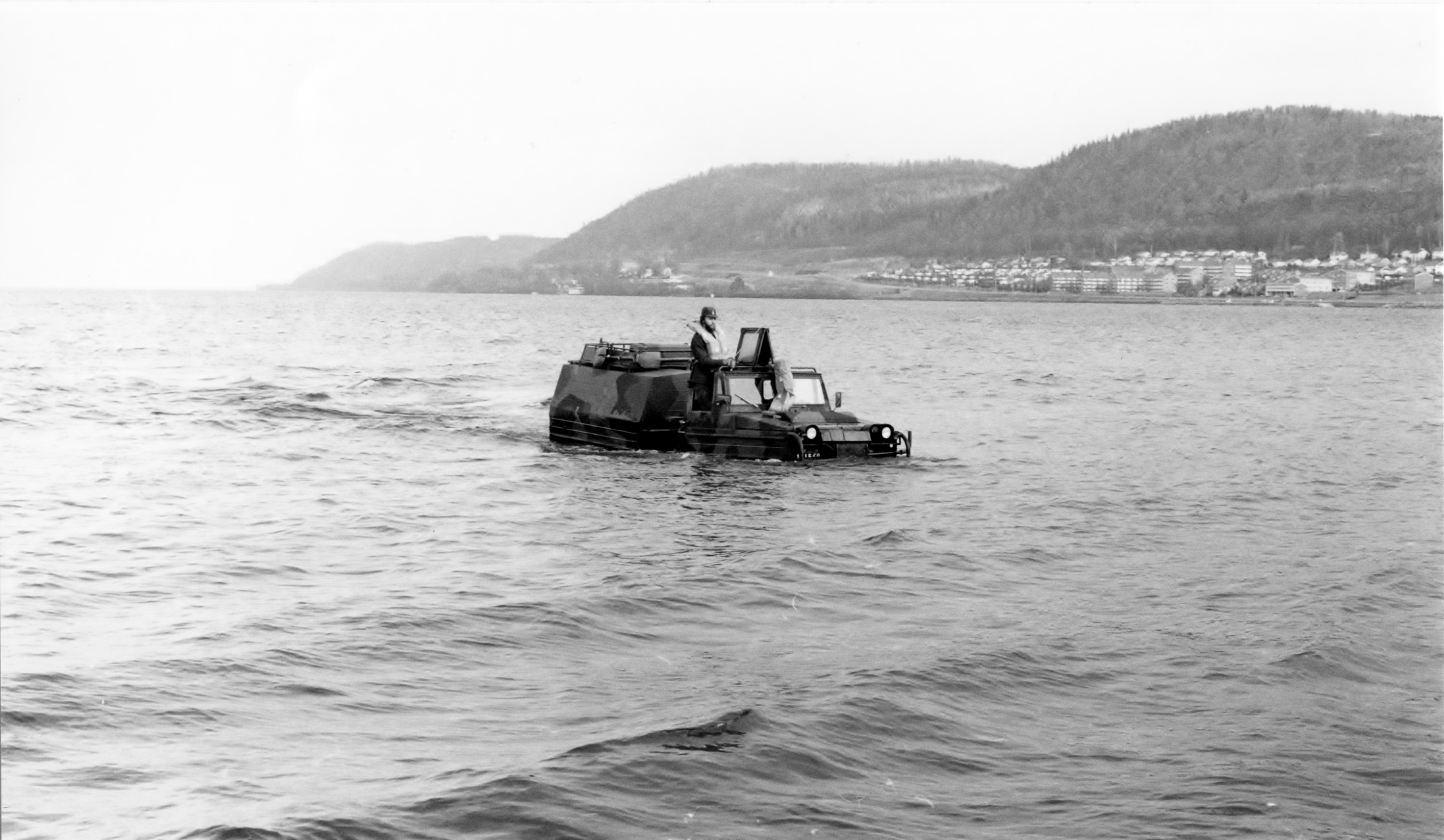
Bv 202 in amphibious use

The vehicle is formed by two rubber Kegresse track units with a multi-directional pivot in between. The front unit contains the engine and gearbox through which power is delivered to the front and, via a propshaft in the pivot mechanism, the rear tracks. A hydraulic ram on the pivot "bends" the vehicle in the middle to steer it—there is no braking of track units for steering as on conventional tracklaying vehicles. The controls are a conventional steering wheel on the left-hand front of the vehicle. It can reach a speed of 35 km/h on land and 7 km/h (3.8 kn) on water.

The Bv 202 carries a driver and a commander in the front unit and up to eight troops or 800 kg in the trailer unit. It can be adapted for other applications.

Production started in Arvika in 1964 and ended in 1981. The Bv 202 has since been succeeded by the Bandvagn 206, originally designed and built by Swedish engineering company Hägglund & Söner and now produced by BAE Systems AB.

The Mk1 Bv 202 is powered by an 82.5 bhp (61.5 kW) Volvo B18, the MK2 by the 97 bhp (72 kW) B20. It has less ground pressure than a skier and is fully amphibious.

== Operational history ==
The Bv 202 was used by NATO forces, and replaced the older Swedish Snow Trac ST4 Over-snow Vehicle, which was employed by the British Royal Marines under NATO. The Royal Marines operated around 76 Bv 202 units during the Falklands War, with some of the being present during the capture of Port Stanley and some being transported by the SS Atlantic Conveyor when it sank. One of the surviving Bv 202s is located at the Ontario Regiment Museum, in Oshawa.

The Bv 202 was designed to transport troops and equipment through snow or boglands in northern Sweden. The Norrland Dragoon Regiment was last Swedish unit to use this vehicle, finding that the manual gearbox Bv 202 was much quieter than the automatic transmission Bv 206.

The Norwegian Army used both Bv 202 and Bv 206 concurrently, with the Bv 202 being the one used in situations of deep snow due to better performance in such condition.

Some Bv 202 units were donate to the Armed Forces of Ukraine during the Russo-Ukrainian war, being used by units such as the 115th Mechanized Brigade (Ukraine) and 118th Territorial Defense Brigade (Ukraine). Those were donated by the Norwegian government and by private Nonprofit organizations.

== Variants ==
A radiocommunications variant called Bandvagn 203 was used by Sweden, with one of them being in the Kalix Line museum in Kalix, in the county of Norbotten.

== Operators ==
- Canada
- Norway - replaced the M29 Weasel and subsequently replaced by Bv 206
- Sweden - replaced by Bv 206. Used by several units, including cavalry and paratroper units, including use by the Swedish Parachute Ranger School.
- United Kingdom - replaced "ST4 Snow Trac Over-snow Vehicle" and subsequently replaced by Bv 206
- Ukraine - donated by Sweden an unnamed number of vehicles.

=== Civilian operators ===
- Russia At least 27 ex-Norwegian vehicles sold to Russian company for tourist use in the Murmansk area.

== See also ==
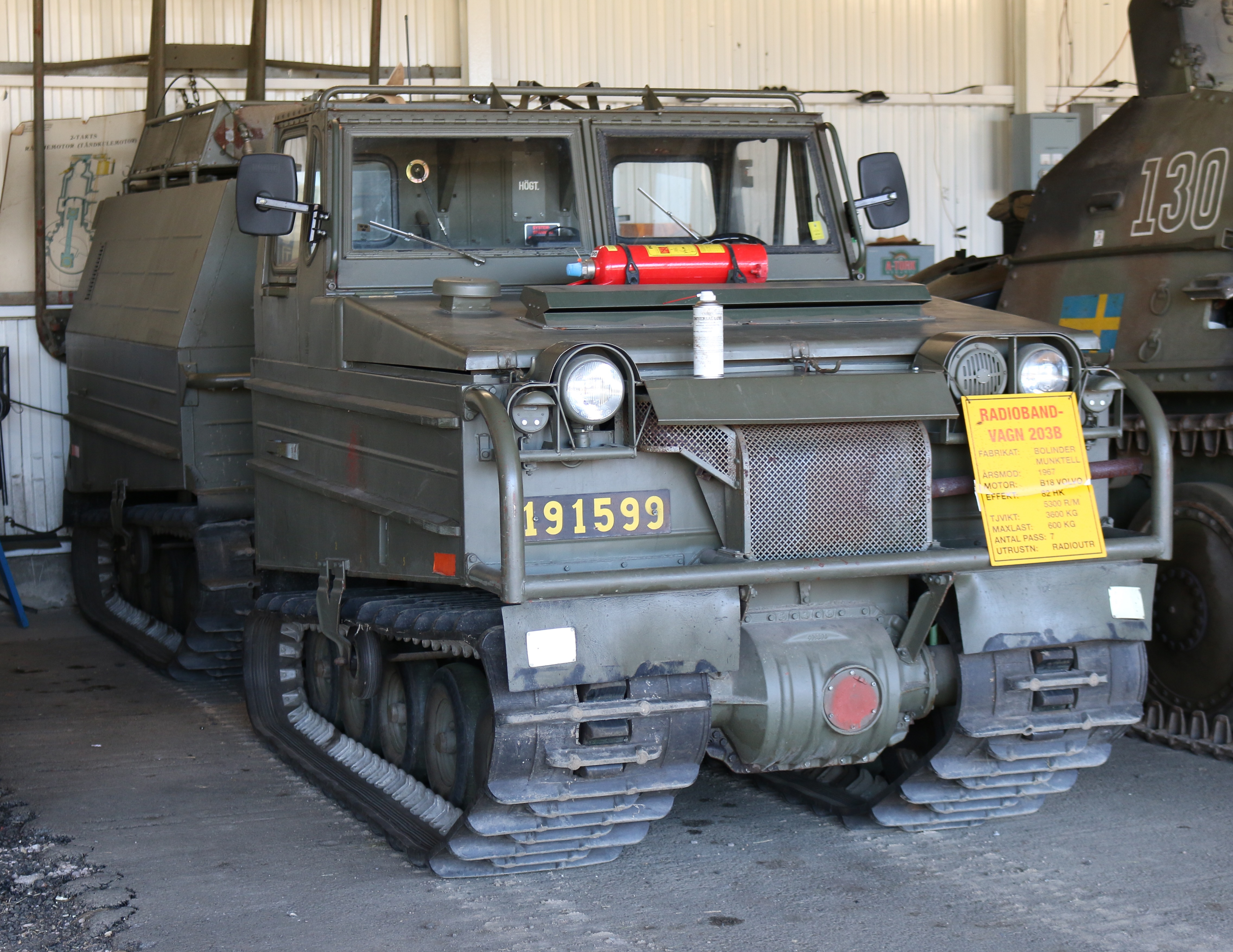
Radiobandvagn 203, in the Artillerimuseet in Kristianstad.

- Snow Trac

Similar vehicles to the Bv 202 ATV include:

- Sisu Auto Sisu Nasu Finland
- ST Kinetics Bronco All Terrain Tracked Carrier Singapore
- Hägglund & Söner Bv206 Sweden
- BAE Systems AB BvS 10 Sweden
- (Ishimbai Transport Machine-Building Plant) Vityaz (ATV) Soviet Union
