= Tucker Sno-Cat =

Family of tracked vehicles

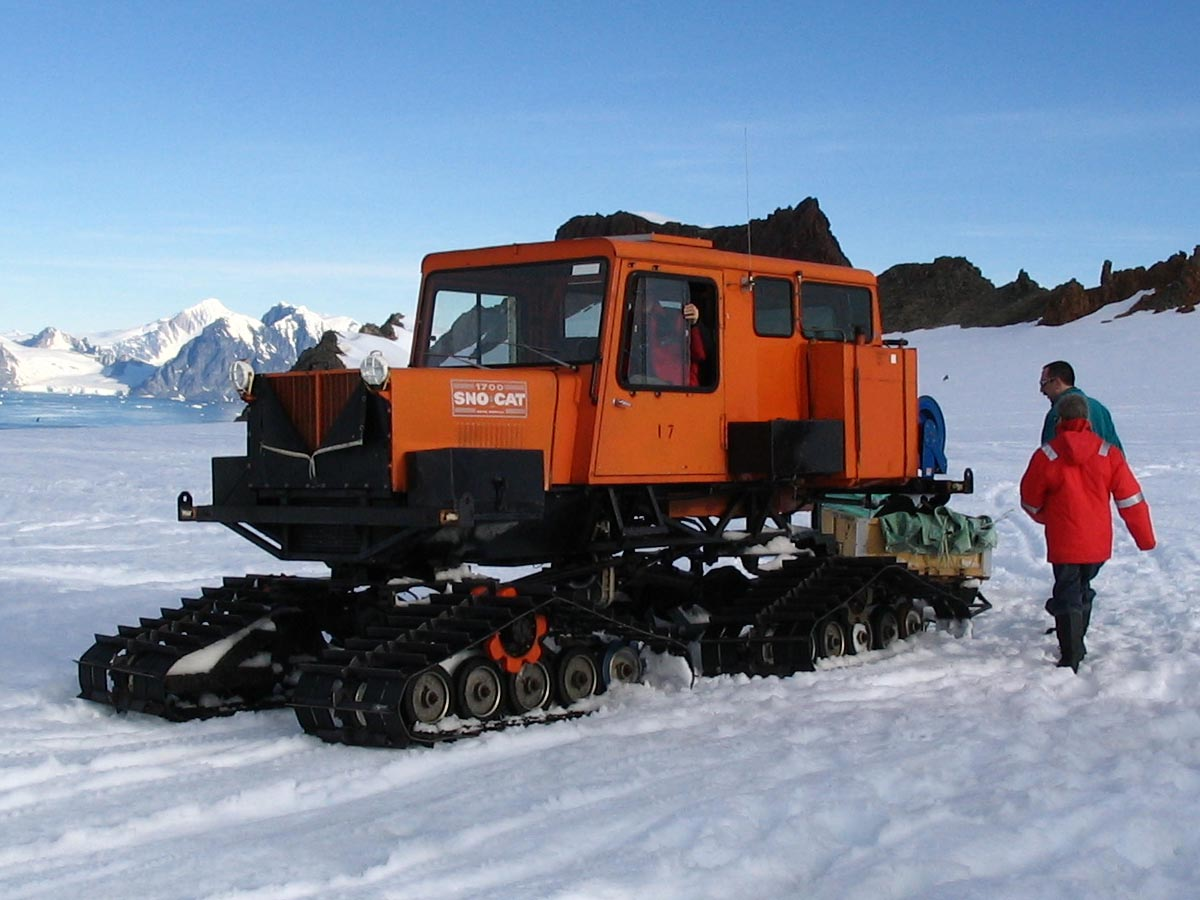
A Sno-Cat at Rothera on Adelaide Island off Antarctica

The Tucker Sno-Cat is a family of tracked vehicles for snow conditions, manufactured in Medford, Oregon by the company of the same name.

Different models have been used for expeditions in the Arctic and the Antarctic during the second half of the 20th century. It differs from other truck-sized snow vehicles, commonly known as snowcats, by its use of four independently mounted sets of tracks.

== Early models ==
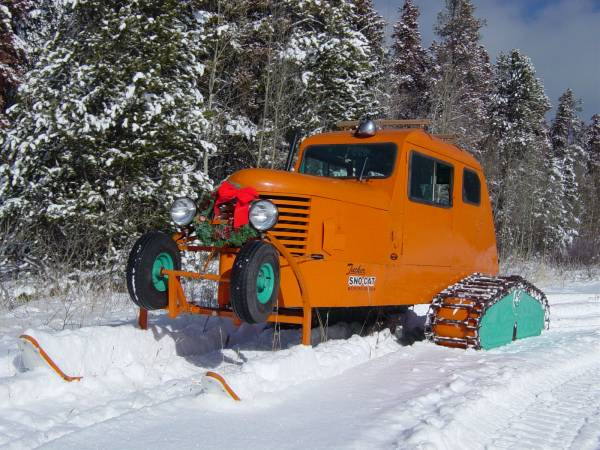
1949 dual-ski, dual-track Tucker Sno-Cat

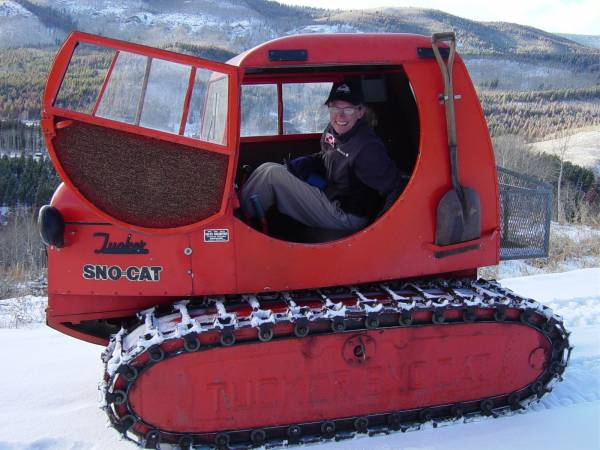
Curved-door Tucker Kitten variant

While the majority of Tucker Sno-Cats utilized four sets of tracks, a few experimental models and early production models used two sets of tracks. Initially Tucker Sno-Cats employed two front-mounted steering skis and two sets of tracks mounted to the rear. However, there are at least three production models that only employed dual tracks—the small 222 Tucker Kitten, the 322, and the 323 models were all two-track Tucker Sno-Cats with a conventional front engine design. There are at least two variants of the Tucker Kitten, some have square corner doors while others have rounded corner doors. The Kitten was powered by a 10 hp engine. Additionally there was at least one prototype featuring two tracks and a mid-engine design.

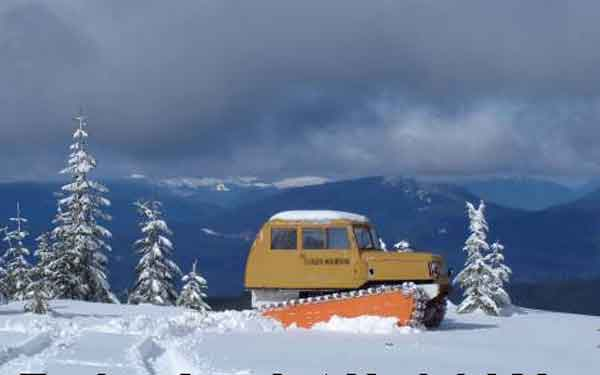
Rare dual-track Tucker 323 Sno-Cat

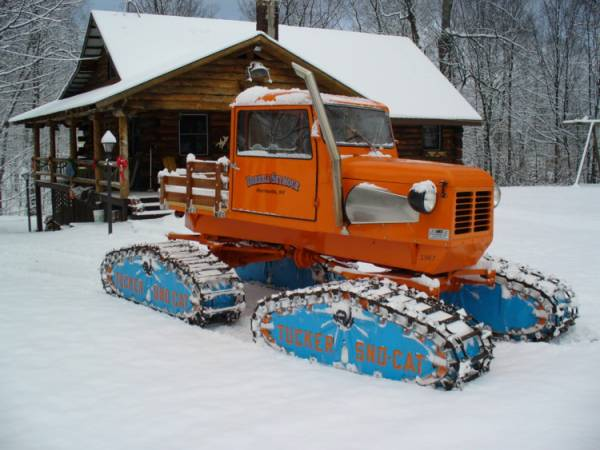
Restored 1967 Tucker Model 342

The more common four track Tucker Sno-Cats are considered to be the classic Sno-Cats in American history and have been used extensively in both polar regions for exploration, as well as for transportation, trail grooming and industrial applications. The body style could be configured in many ways and sedan styles, enclosed cargo styles and open bed configurations were all available. Model numbers designated the configuration of the unit, for example a Model 342 was a "300" series, four-track, two-door Tucker Sno-Cat. A Model 443 would be a "400" series, four-track, three-door unit. In the early models, there were ultimately series 200 through 900, with the higher numbers being larger units. The 500 series Tuckers employed extra wide tracks which allowed them to carry heavy loads in very deep soft snow conditions. The early model Tucker Sno-Cats all utilized a unique steel track that revolved around a steel pontoon, the steel pontoons were eventually replaced by fiberglass pontoons. As the models evolved, the steel tracks were replaced with a suspension system that employed rubber belts that were carried by a series of small wheels. Fastened to the exterior of the rubber belts are cleats, also called grousers, made of metal, to offer traction on the snow.

== Track design evolution ==
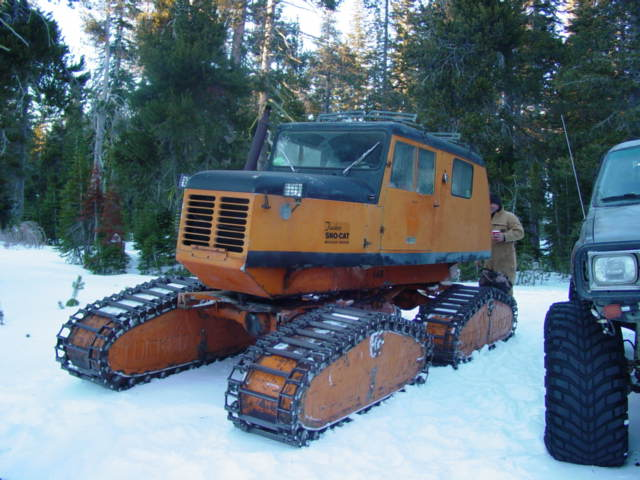
Original steel tracks

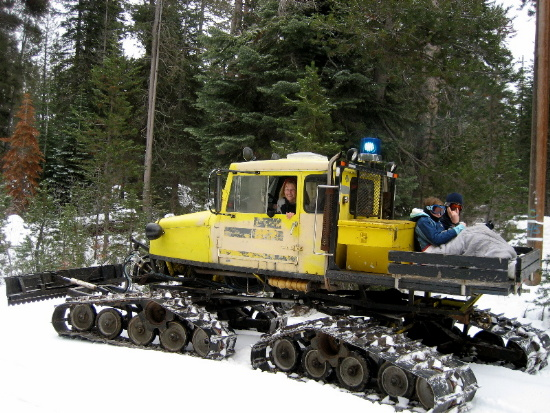
Belted tracks

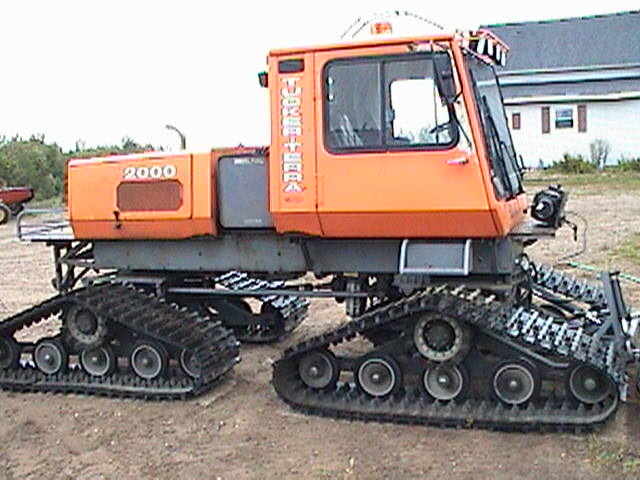
Modern Terra track

Tucker Sno-Cats were originally built with a steel track that rotates around a steel pontoon. Located at the top center of the pontoon is a drive sprocket with teeth that drive the chain-like tracks around the steel pontoon. Due to maintenance issues with rust on the steel pontoons, fiberglass pontoons eventually replaced some steel parts but the overall mechanism was basically unchanged.

Steel tracks revolving around pontoons were replaced with a system that employed two rubber belts with metal cleats, or grousers, attached to the outside perimeter to grip the snow. A series of wheels and guides were used inside the belts. Two drive sprockets on a hub drive the rubber belted track. The most modern version of the Sno-Cat track is the all-rubber Terra Track system. This system uses a wide single rubber belt, constructed with a multi-ply design similar to a modern car tire. The exterior perimeter employs molded rubber treads instead of the steel grousers of prior models.

== Modern uses ==
Tucker Sno-Cat products are used at ski resorts and snowmobile clubs as a trail groomer, for passenger transport in polar regions, in fire suppression roles, and drilling and crane operations.

=== Antarctic exploration ===
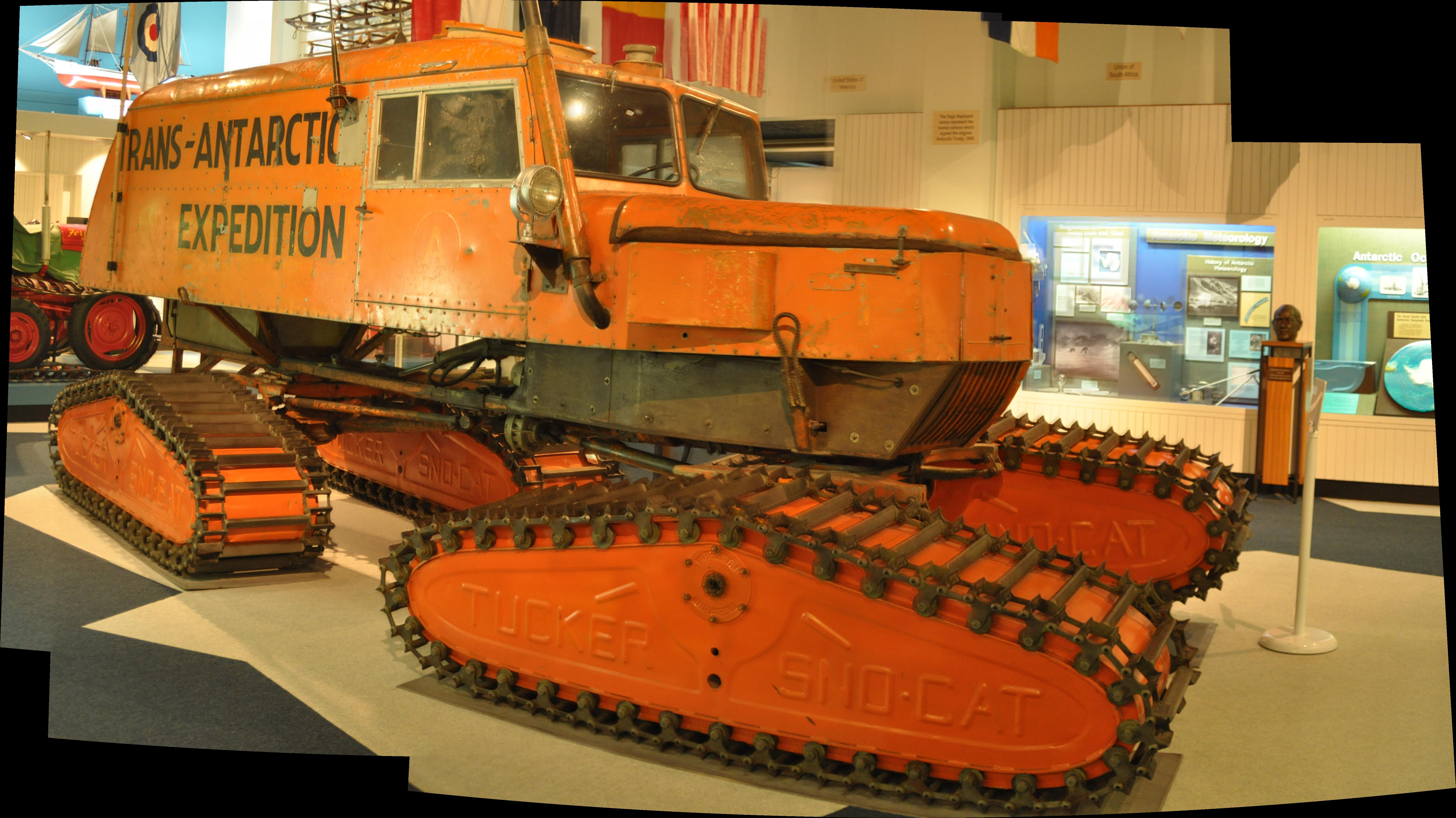
Expedition Sno-Cat on display in the Canterbury Museum in Christchurch, New Zealand

English explorer Sir Vivian Fuchs championed the first Trans-Antarctic expedition, and utilized four specially prepared Tucker Sno-Cats. Tucker Sno-Cats are still considered a premier extreme condition vehicle, and are still in use in both the Arctic and Antarctic regions. Of the three Tucker Sno-Cats that traveled to the South Pole, door-code 'A' is on display in the Antarctic section of the Canterbury Museum in Christchurch, New Zealand. Door-code 'B' is on display at the Antique Gas and Steam Engine Museum in Vista, California, United States. Door-code 'C' was returned to the UK, and is currently displayed in the Science Museum at Wroughton, and is currently only viewable via appointment at this location. The fate of the fourth Tucker Sno-Cat door-code 'D' is unknown, and may still be in the vicinity of Shackleton Base.

An image of Tucker Sno-Cat door-code 'B' spanning a crevasse is included in the Voyager Golden Record as image #108.

== See also ==
- M7 snow tractor
- Arctic Cat
- Bombardier Inc.
- Bulldozer
- Hägglund & Söner
- Snow coach
