= List of Bombardier recreational and snow vehicles =

The following is a list of vehicles and crafts made by Bombardier and (since 2003) Bombardier Recreational Products of Canada. In 2004 the industrial vehicles division was sold to the Camoplast (now Camso) company of Canada.

== 3-Wheel Vehicles (See also: Can-Am Spyder) (since 2007) ==
- Canyon
- Ryker
- Spyder
  - Spyder F3
  - Spyder RS
  - Spyder RT
  - Spyder ST

== Motorcycles (See also Can-Am Motorcycles) ==
- Bantam
- MX-1
- MX-2
- Origin
- Pulse
- T’NT

== Outboard motors ==
- Outboard Marine Corporation purchased 2001
  - Evinrude Outboard Motors
  - Johnson Outboards

== Off-road vehicles (See also: Can-Am Off-Road) ==
- Can-Am ATV's (since 1998)
  - DS50
  - DS70
  - DS90
  - DS90X
  - DS250
  - DS450
  - DS450X
  - DS650
  - DS650 Baja
  - Outlander 450/500/570/650/700/800/1000
  - Quest
  - Rally 200
  - Renegade 570/650/850/1000
  - Traxter
- Can-Am UTV's (since 2010)
  - Commander
  - Defender (Traxter)
  - Maverick
  - Maverick R
- John Deere Buck all-terrain vehicle made under license by Bombardier

== Snowmobiles and Snowcats ==
- Bombi
- Moto-Ski purchased 1971
- Ski-Doo
- Lynx (snowmobile) of Finland, purchased (?)
- John Deere Buck all-terrain vehicle made by Bombardier
- Muskeg tractor for snow conditions, of 1950s

== Watercraft ==
- Sea-Doo, Bombardier brand of personal water craft
- Sea-Doo XP, specific model of personal water craft
- Sea-Doo GTX, specific model of personal water craft
- Bombardier Invitation sailboat
- Bombardier 7.6 sailboat

== Engines ==
- Rotax (Austria), engines for many of the above
