= Sea-Doo GTX =

Personal watercraft

Sea-Doo
- Product type: Personal watercraft
- Produced by: Bombardier Recreational Products
- Country: Canada
- Introduced: 1992
- Related brands: Sea-Doo XP
- Markets: Worldwide
- Website: https://www.sea-doo.com

The Sea-Doo GTX is a personal watercraft (PWC) made by Bombardier Recreational Products of Canada. Part of their Sea-Doo line of watercraft, the Sea-Doo GTX has been produced since 1992. It is a three-person personal water craft with a 'luxury' ride combined with a series of engines. The performance of a Rotax marine engine with R.A.V.E. exhaust, a three-passenger contoured seat; dual mirrors; deck pads; ski-eye; left-side forward/neutral/reverse lever; and full instrumentation.

Models available over the years have included the XP, DI, RFI, GSI, and GTX Limited.

== Timeline ==
1995 This would be the last year of the traditional 3 seater body that Sea-Doo was using for the GTX. Design was similar to 1994 with same colors, but with different font for the GTX decal, and more aerodynamically designed side-view mirrors. Engine was 657x with dual carburetors producing 80HP. Cluster gauges included speedometer and digital fuel gauge with individual warning lights for fuel, battery, oil, and temperature. Color Scheme:Green and White, purple rear handlebar

1996 1996 marks the first year that the hull design changed to the "dolphin" style body. A storage compartment was added in front of rider for easier access during use. Reverse and neutral handle moved to left side of body. Cluster gauge received upgrades with a digital information center, tachometer, and speedometer. Color Scheme: Two Tone, Green and White

1997 Color scheme: Same as previous year: Two Tone, Green and White

1998 Engine is two cylinder 782 cc (47.7 cu in) RAVE using carburetors or electronic fuel injection, essentially the same engine as the GSX RFI. The GTX Limited has the 947cc (951) engine

Bombardier Formula Jet Pump, with a stainless steel impeller pitched at 16/24 degrees. It includes a forward/neutral/reverse system that is activated by a lever located on the left side of the console, allowing use in tandem with the throttle, good for towing skiers.

The 123 x 46.9 inch, full-V multi-chine hull is made with fiberglass and features hooked sponsons on either side of the hull. Unique "Champagne and Ice White" color scheme and fake mahogany finish on glove box.

1999 GTX RFI

Only a few minor changes. New electronic fuel injection chip - improves high altitude and bottom end performance. Safe mode is less drastic. The hull and deck are identical to last year. The two-part seat is angled in the driver area and offers well-positioned handholds for the passenger. The craft also features tilt steering (it moves from 30.5 inches to 33 inches). Same color combination as 1998.

Standard features include analog speedometer and tachometer and an LCD multi-function gauge that includes fuel and oil gauge, hour meter, low fuel, oil, voltage and overheat warnings, compass, trip meter and clock, air and water temperature, average and peak speed and various maintenance information. The gauges are recessed in the hood, in front of the handlebars. The craft also features dual mirrors and a true tow rope hook. Like all of Sea-Doo's models, the GTX features Sea-Doo's Digital Electronic Security System, which uses a lanyard fitted with a computer chip encoded with a specific code for your boat.

On-board storage includes a standard compartment in the bow with two twist-off watertight containers, a storage cooler underneath the back part of the seat and the smaller glove box on the console. Total Storage is 26 US gallons (98 L). The fuel tank holds 15 US gallons (57 L), with three gallons in reserve. (The reserve comes on automatically because of the RFI.) The oil reservoir is 1.6 US gallons (6.1 L). For the redesigned 2002 model, both the DI and the 4-Tec have a 53 gal. front storage compartment.

2000 Top Deck newly redesigned for Millennium Model.

2002 Change to four-stroke Rotax engine, 155 hp. Color scheme: Two-tone, Atlantic blue and white, Gold and Red

2003 Engines: 4-tec model-155 hp 1494cc SOHC Limited model-185 hp Supercharged 1494cc SOHC

Color scheme: Two Tone, Red and White
