= John Deere Gator =

Family of all-terrain utility vehicles

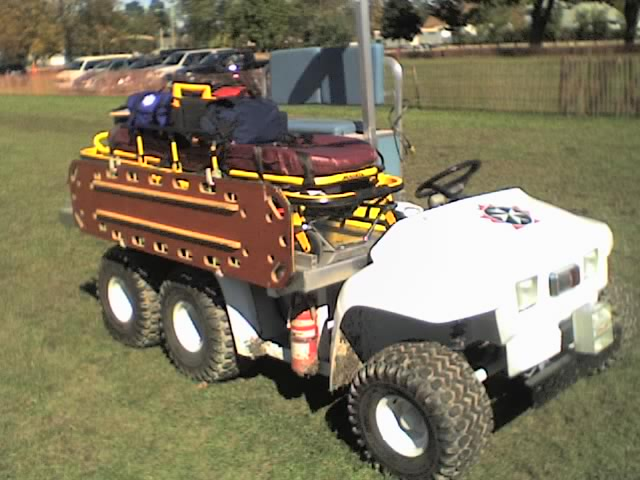
A John Deere Gator converted into an ambulance: This vehicle is owned by Toronto District St. John Ambulance.

The John Deere Gator is a family of small all-terrain utility vehicles produced by the John Deere Corporation. Gators typically feature a box bed, similar in function to a pickup truck. The bed can also be installed as an electric dump body. The John Deere Gator has been made in a variety of configurations, with either four, five or six wheels.

The Gator line of vehicles are designed to serve on farms, worksites, and ranches, rather than as a pure off-road vehicle. However, it is possible to order with specific off-road features. Introduced in 1992, the vehicle replaced the five-wheeled John Deere AMT line introduced in 1987.

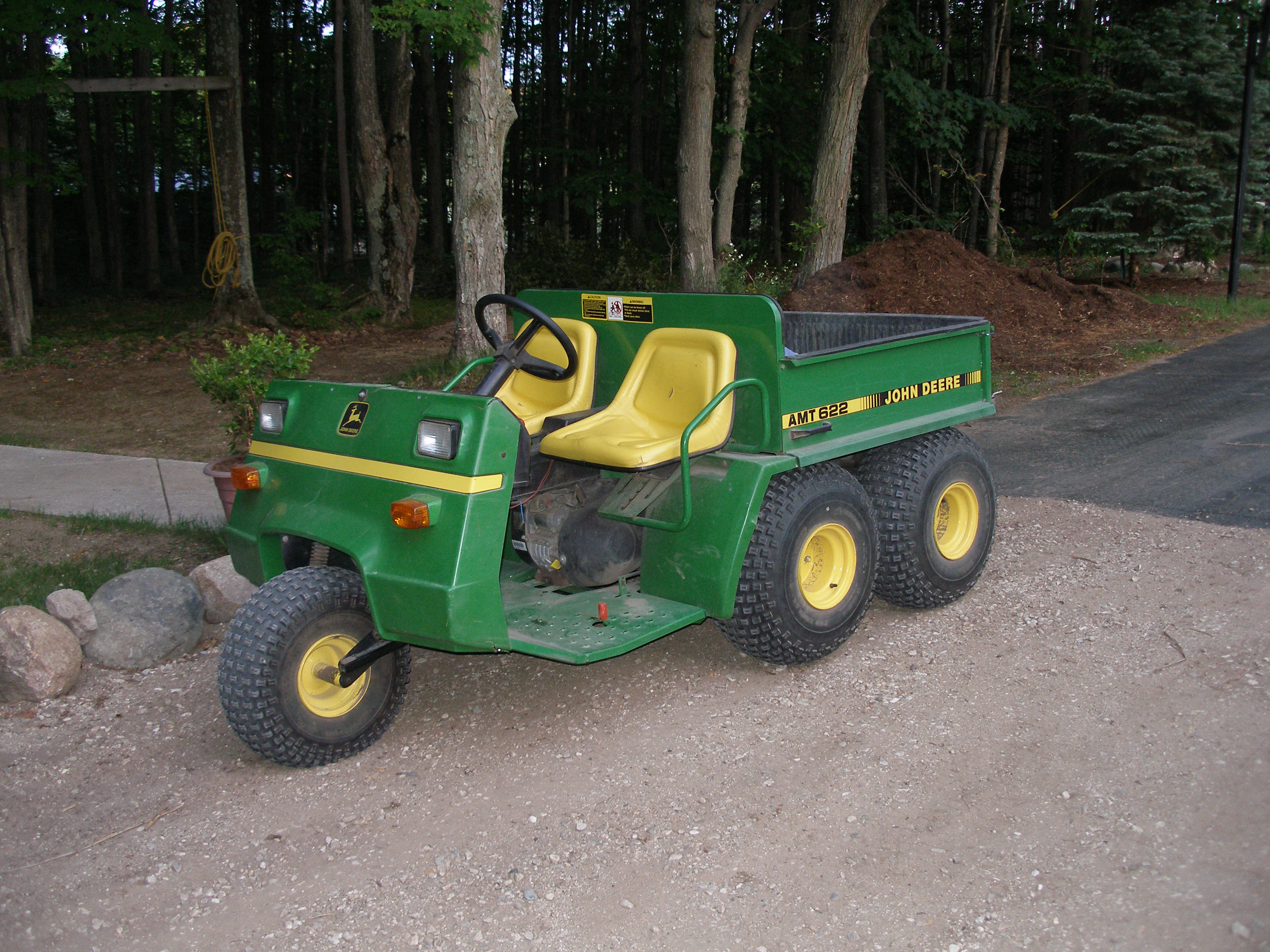
The AMT 622/626 was the second-generation predecessor to the Gator 1988-1998.

== Design ==
The Gator vehicles use small but powerful 341 cc (0.341 L) four-stroke engines found in lawn mowers, or an optional diesel engine that is also found in some Deere mowers and utility tractors. They use a continuously variable transmission employing a belt and a conical pulley system. Thus, they require no clutch or gear shifts to operate. Many third-party attachments are available for the Gator, including snow plows, sanders, and gun racks.

The recommended maximum payload capacity is 600 lb (272 kg). The Gator's predecessor, the AMT (short for "all-materials transporter"), was designed to easily be loaded into the back of a pickup truck to be transported to various remote and/or hard to get to location that conventional means such as towing a trailer would prove dangerous or troublesome. The first and second-generation AMT models were simple, easy to maintain, and easy to fix on site.

== Variants ==
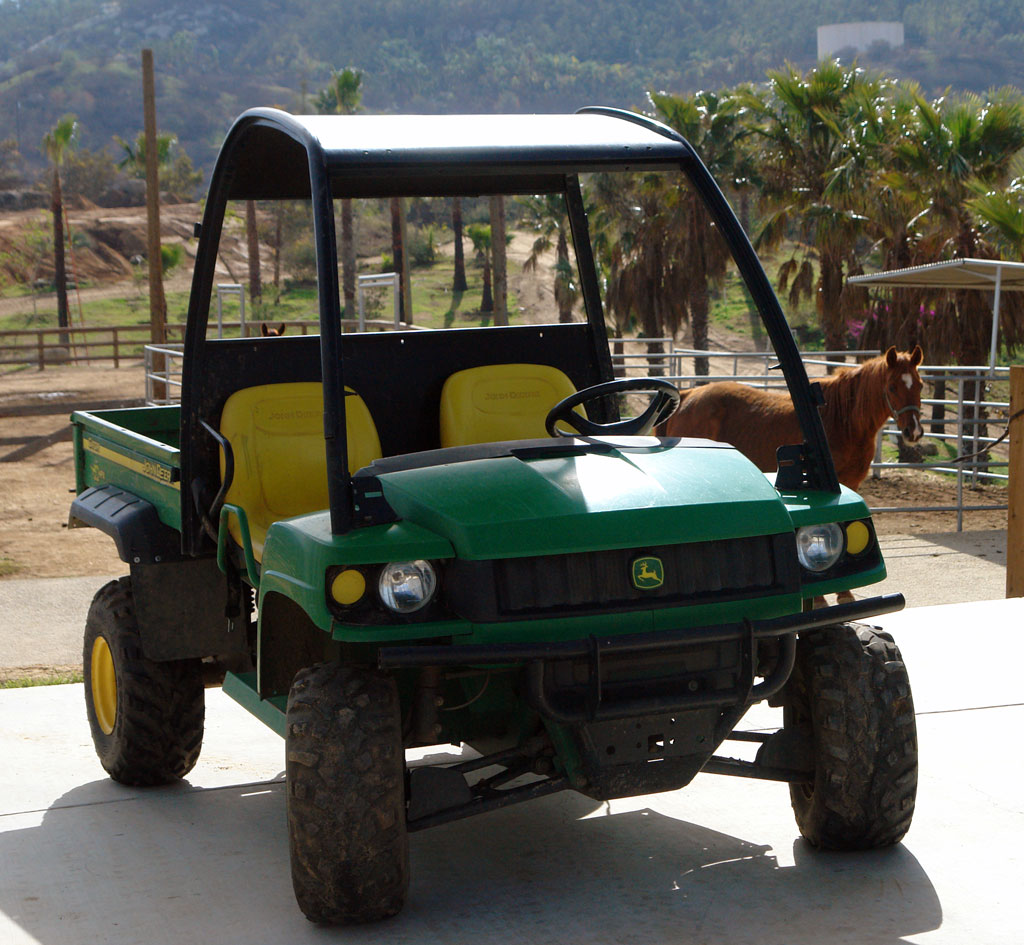
A Gator HPX in use at a ranch

Within the Gator family of vehicles, John Deere produces several lines. They are the Traditional Series, the High Performance (HPX) Series, the Compact Series, and the XUV Series. It also offers several specialty vehicles including the more off-road-oriented Trail Gator, which is olive in color to better serve recreational and sporting uses. The Turf Gator is specially designed to serve golf courses. The M-Gator is a militarized variant used by the U.S. Army.

=== Traditional Series ===
The Traditional Series is the second generation of the original Gator, designed for medium-duty work.

=== HPX Series ===
The High Performance or HPX Series Gators, introduced in 2004, are larger than the original Gator, and designed for heavier-duty use.

=== Compact Series ===
The Compact Series Gators, also introduced in 2004, are smaller and more like a golf cart in size and operation. They are targeted at homeowners rather than commercial customers.

=== Gator XUV ===
The Gator XUV 4x4 was introduced in 2007 as a more extreme-use Gator, for both commercial and recreational use. These models are often set up with snow plows and have severe use in the industry. The model comes with either gasoline or diesel engine choices.

=== Gator XUV 2011 Model ===
In response to an ever competitive market, Deere expanded the XUV line-up in 2011 to include an 825 cc, three-cylinder gas engine as an option to the current 625 cc engine. The 825 also sported a faster differential that allows the machine to reach speeds up 70 km (45 mi) per hour. In addition, they kept the diesel offering, but boosted the machines' speed to 32 mph, then the fastest diesel utility vehicle in the market. The three machines also underwent a styling overhaul and a redesigned box.

=== M-Gator and R-Gator ===
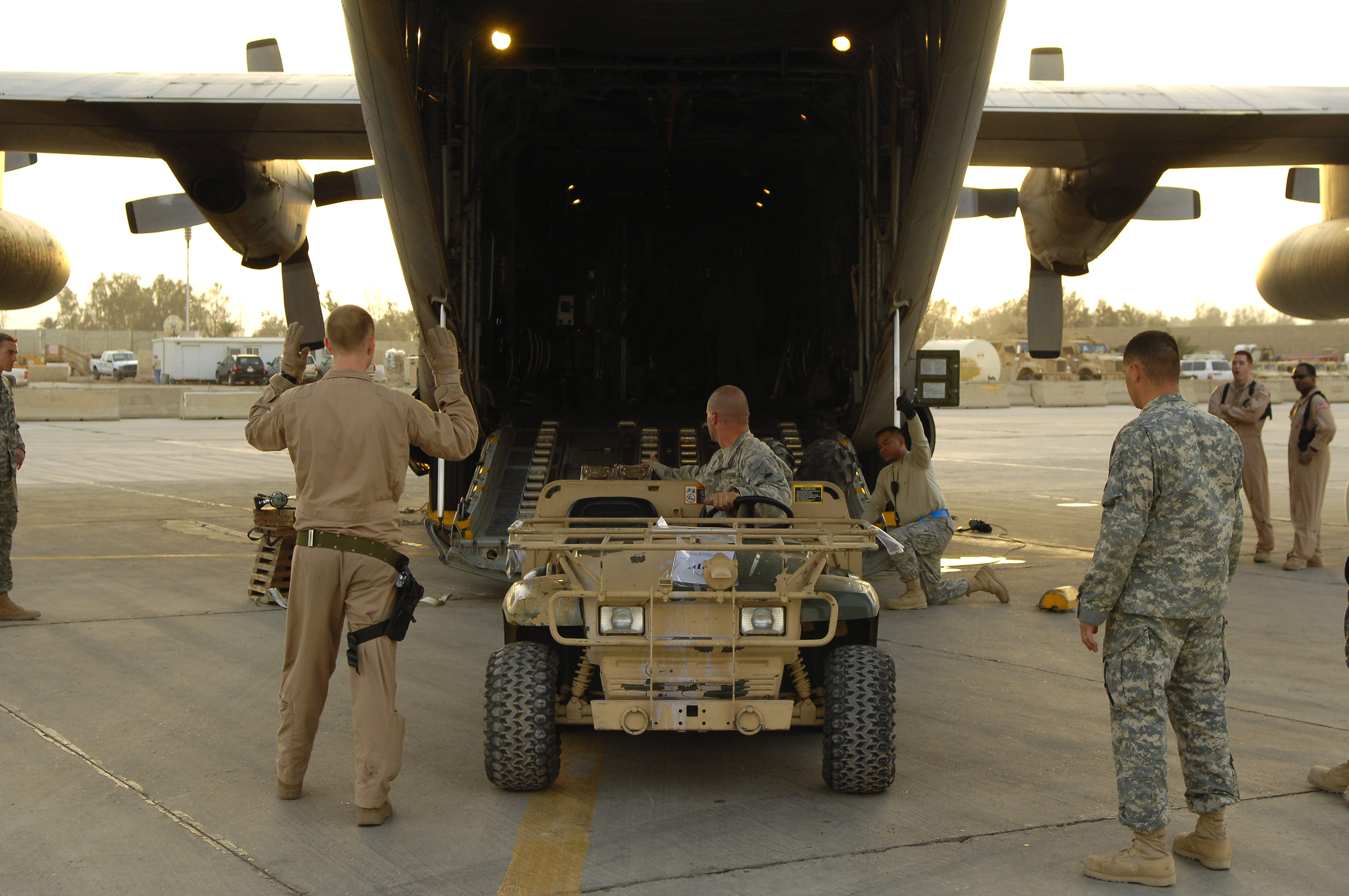
M-Gator in Iraq

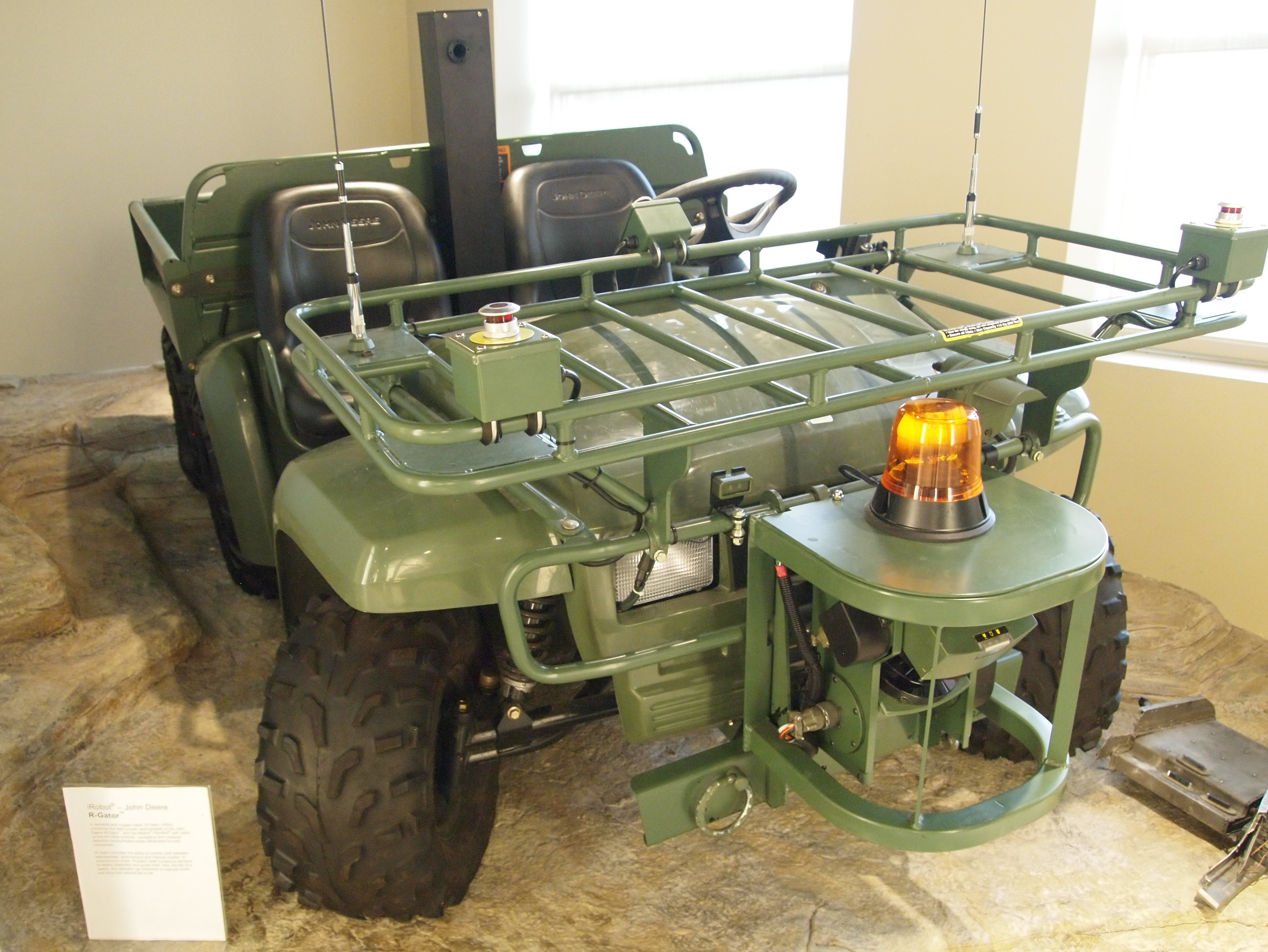
R-Gator, an autonomous vehicle developed by iRobot and John Deere

In 1997 to 1998, the 261st Area Support Medical Battalion of the 44th Medical Brigade brought a Gator to Bosnia for Operation SFOR2. It was an off-the-shelf commercial version Gator that was painted in camouflage and equipped with a carrying tray on its hood, as well as brackets to hold rifles. Its main purpose was for casualty evacuation, and it could hold two litters on the rear deck. It came in handy for utility work as well, and was used mostly by the medical supply section for transporting supplies and equipment.

In 1997, the U.S. Army adopted a version of the Gator known as the M-Gator. The M-Gator is now also in use with the U.S. Marine Corps. Following the upgrades of the original Gator, it is known as the M-Gator A1, and features upgrades such as rollover protection. It is the 6x4 variant, and uses the three-cylinder Yanmar diesel engine found in other Gator vehicles, and is also capable of using JP-8 fuel.

The vehicle is capable of being air-dropped. The Gator was used in Iraq and Afghanistan for supply deliveries and casualty evacuation, as it is more nimble off-road than an HMMWV. Although the M-Gator was not designed to carry equipment in the field, troops would put their gear onto the vehicles to lighten their loads when an M-Gator was available to them. M-Gators were also used by Canadian Forces in Afghanistan.

In 2016, the U.S. rated its fleet of military UTVs, indicated as 'LTATV' (Lightweight Tactical All Terrain Vehicles), including the M-Gator A1 and M-Gator A3 at 1,100 lb (500 kg) for 4x4 units, and at 1,200 lb (540 kg) payload capacity for 6-wheeled units.

The M-Gator has been developed into an unmanned ground vehicle, known as the R-Gator. It was developed by John Deere and iRobot. It is capable of autonomous operations such as waypoint following with obstacle avoidance, and following dismounted infantry soldiers, as well as other vehicles.

=== Turf Vehicles series ===
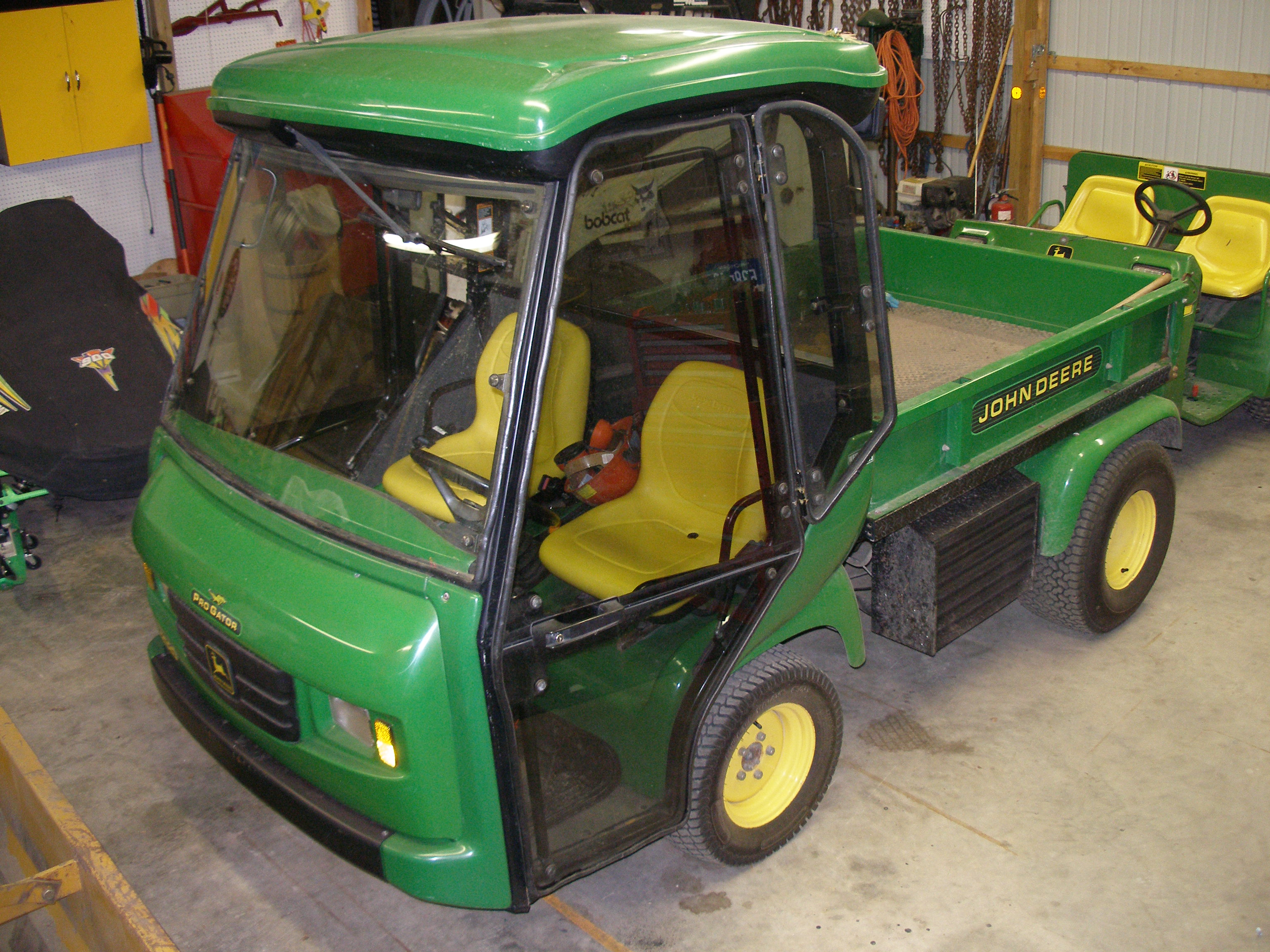
John Deere ProGator

The Turf Vehicles series features the Gator TX, Gator TE, and the ProGator vehicles. The ProGators are intended for heavy-duty farm work. The TX and TE are for niche industrial duties where quiet vehicles are desired, such as golf courses. The TE is an electric vehicle.

== See also ==
- John Deere (inventor)
- John Deere (Deere & Company)
- John Deere Buck
- M274 ½-ton 4×4 utility platform truck, the M-Gator predecessor in the US Army
