= List of Bombardier Transportation products =

Bombardier Transportation produced a wide variety of rail transportation vehicles, including high speed trains, regional, suburban and metro trains, trams, and locomotives as well as passenger carriages.

== Metro rolling stock ==
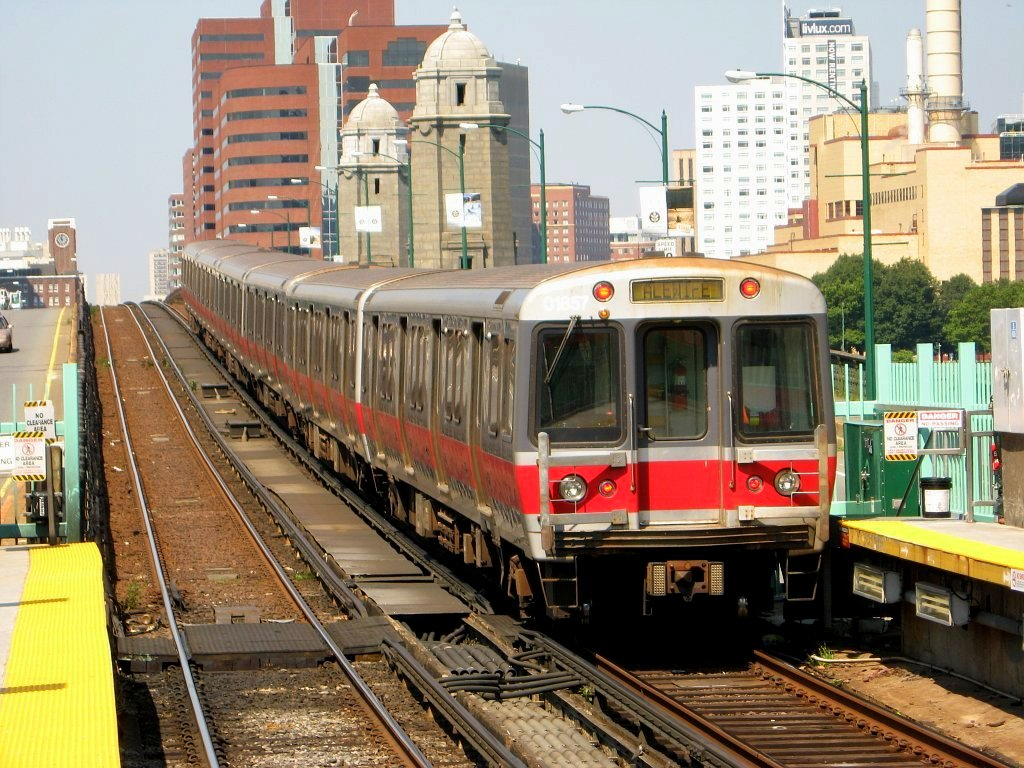
MBTA Red Line train (Boston Subway)

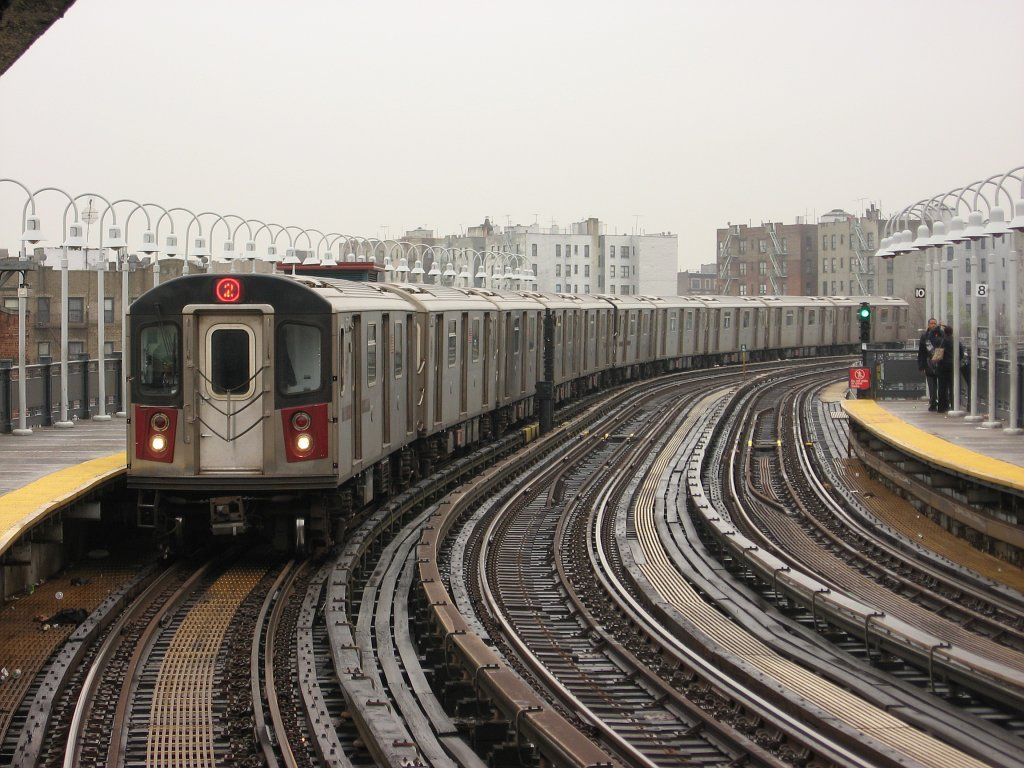
R142 car (NYC Subway)

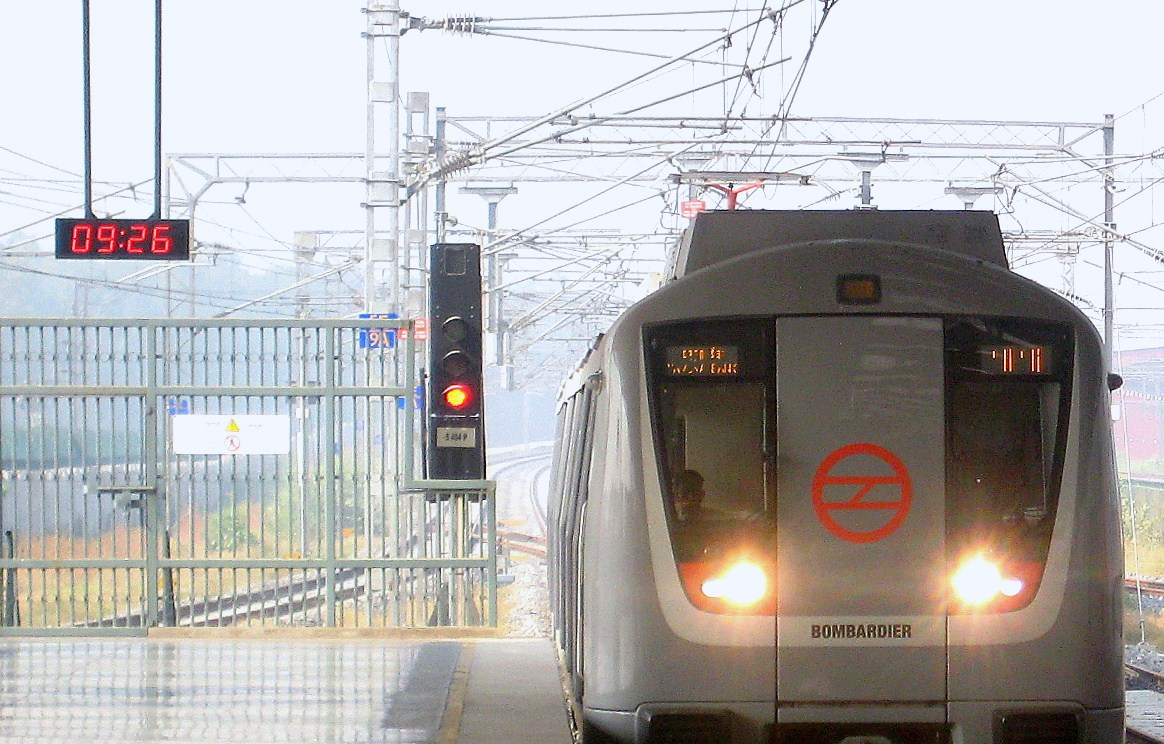
Delhi Metro broad gauge train, manufactured by Bombardier.

Bombardier's standard metro vehicles are the mid-sized fully automated and driverless INNOVIA Metro with the option for linear induction motor propulsion or a conventional rotary motor, and the high-capacity customizable MOVIA Metro, which is powered by conventional motors and can also be fully automated. In addition, Bombardier has produced many custom metro models not based on either model.

- Airtrain JFK: INNOVIA ART 200 (ART Mark II)
- Ankara Metro: Modified H-6
- BART: 775-car "Fleet of the Future"; contract for 410 cars (Type D and E cars) awarded May 2012
- Beijing Subway: INNOVIA ART 200 (ART Mark II) cars for the Airport Express line
- Berlin U-Bahn: H & HK train stocks
- Boston Subway: "#3 Red Line" cars (01800 series)
- Bucharest Metro: MOVIA 346 for lines 1,2 and 3
- Chicago 'L': 706 new cars under construction
- Detroit People Mover: INNOVIA ART 100 (ART Mark I)
- Docklands Light Railway: all rolling stock
- Delhi Metro: Broad-gauge MOVIA trainsets
- Gold Coast G: Link: Flexity 2 featuring low floors and having dedicated spaces for wheelchairs, prams and surfboards
- Hong Kong MTR: A-Stock
- Helsinki Metro: M200
- RapidKL: INNOVIA ART 200 (ART Mark II) cars for the Kelana Jaya Line
- Montreal Metro: MR-73, MPM-10 (project leader, with Alstom providing underfloor equipment)
- New Generation Rollingstock: NGR700 train series for the QueenslandRail CityTrain and AirTrain network. Runs on all lines except the Ferny Grove, Beenleigh, Rosewood, and Sunshine Coast (bound for Gympie North) lines.
- New York City Subway: R62A, R110B, R142, and R179
- Shanghai Metro: MOVIA 456 (09A01), 07A01, 09A02 and 12A01
- Singapore MRT: MOVIA C951 for the Downtown Line and R151 for the North–South and East–West lines
- Toronto subway: T1 and TR (based on MOVIA) subway cars; S-series RT cars (Produced by UTDC).
- Taipei Rapid Transit System: The extension line of Muzha Line system, which entered official operation on July 4, 2009. INNOVIA APM 256
- London Underground: 2009 Stock (Victoria line), S Stock (subsurface routes)
- Rotterdam Metro: Series 5300, Series 5400, Series 5500 (R Stock / RSG3), and 5600 Series (R Stock / SG3)
- Vancouver Skytrain: INNOVIA ART 100, 200 and 300 (ART Mark I, Mark II and Mark III)

== Monorails ==
- King Abdullah Financial District in Riyadh, Saudi Arabia:3.6 km INNOVIA Monorail 300 (under construction)
- Line 15 (São Paulo Metro) São Paulo, Brazil: 11.6 km (7.2 mi) line INNOVIA Monorail 300

Bombardier Transportation's Transportation Group Incorporated acquired Universal Mobility Incorporated's UM III technologies in 1989. These systems are either still in use or have been retired. Several monorails were manufactured before Universal Mobility was established - the first was manufactured by a local Montreal company, the following two manufactured by UMI predecessor Constam Corporation.

=== Hawker Siddeley Montreal 1967 ===
Monorail	Location	Opened	Closed	Notes	Ref(s)
Minirail	La Ronde	1967	Operating	Only one segment of the system continues to operate	

=== Constam Corporation 1968-1969 ===
Monorail	Location	Opened	Closed	Notes	Ref(s)
Cal Expo	Sacramento, CA	1968	Operating		
Monorail	Hersheypark	1969	Operating	Magic Mountain Metro cars remain in storage	

=== Universal Mobility 1969-1989 ===
Monorail	Location	Opened	Closed	Notes	Ref(s)
Metro	Six Flags Magic Mountain	1971	2001	Cars sold to Hersheypark and system dismantled in 2011	
Carowinds Monorail	Carowinds	1973	1994	First UM Type II Tourister model	
Animal Habitat Monorail	Kings Island	1974	1993		
Monorail	King's Dominion	1975	circa 1990s	Dismantled in the 1990s when with Safari Village attraction was closed.	
Northern Trail monorail	Minnesota Zoo	1979	2013	Removed after it was determined to be too high of a cost to improve.	
Monorail	1984 Louisiana World Exposition	1984	1984	Relocated to Zoo Miami after expo ended	
Monorail	Zoo Miami	1984	Operating	Relocated from 1984 Louisiana World Exposition	

=== Bombardier 1989-present ===
Monorail	Location	Opened	Closed	Notes	Ref(s)
Monorail	Walt Disney World Resort	1989	Operating	Mark VI monorail still in operation today	
Monorail	Tampa International Airport	1991	2020		
Jacksonville Skyway	Jacksonville, FL	1997	Operating		

== Trams and light rail vehicles ==
- Cobra
- Eurotram
- Flexity Family
  - Flexity Outlook
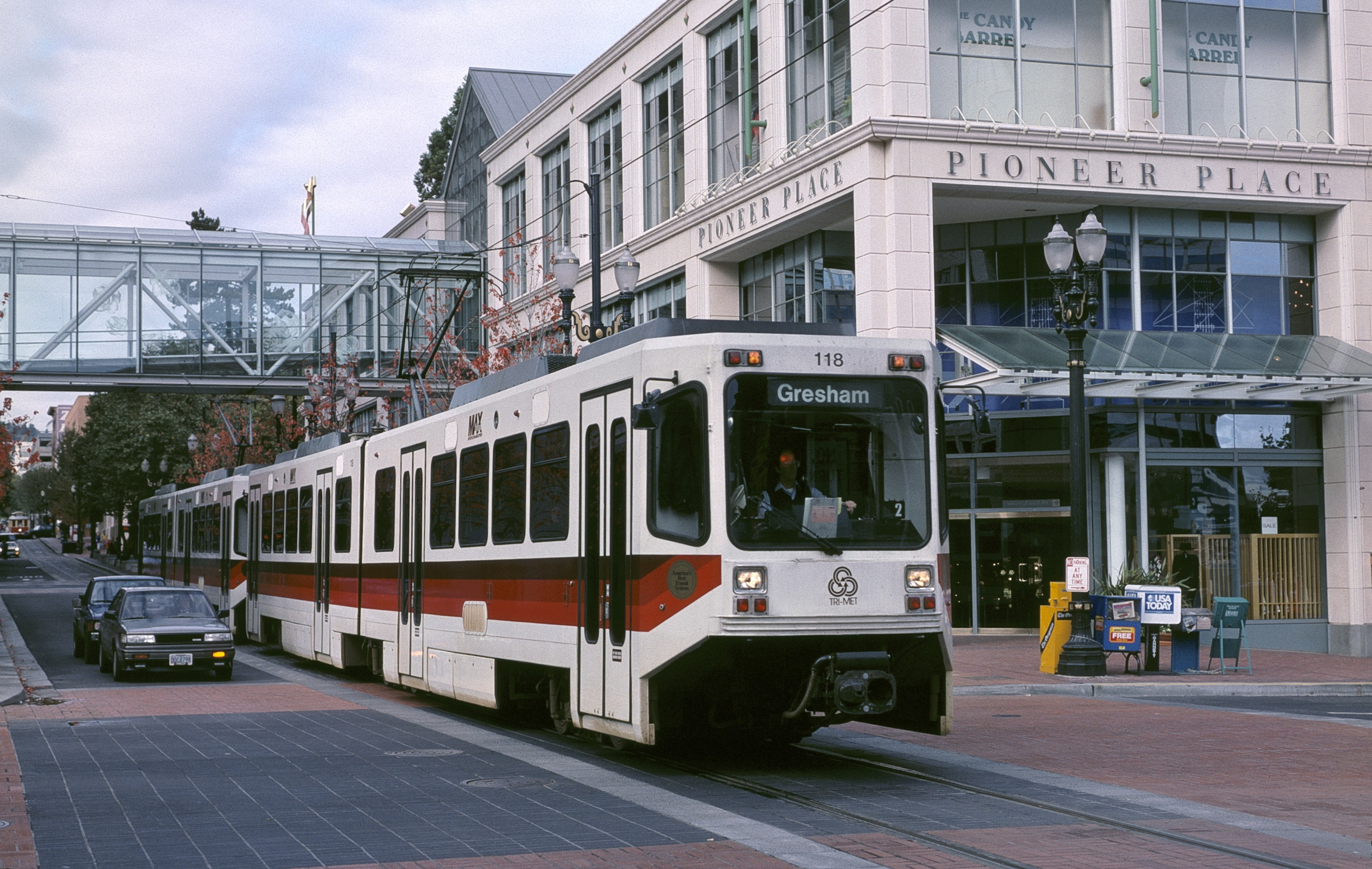
    - Bombardier "type 1" before retirement
      Flexity Outlook (Toronto streetcar)
    - Flexity Freedom (Toronto Eglinton Crosstown LRT and Waterloo Ion LRT)
  - Flexity Classic
  - Flexity Swift
  - Flexity Link (tram-train) BOCLF70
  - Flexity Berlin
  - Flexity 2
- Incentro
- Metropolitan Area Express (Portland, Oregon) (MAX Light Rail) Type 1 LRV in Portland, Oregon (1984-1986)
- TEG-15 delivered to the Guadalajara light rail
- Variotram (unit used on Helsinki tram network only; the Variotram brand has since passed under ownership of Stadler Rail)

== Locomotives ==
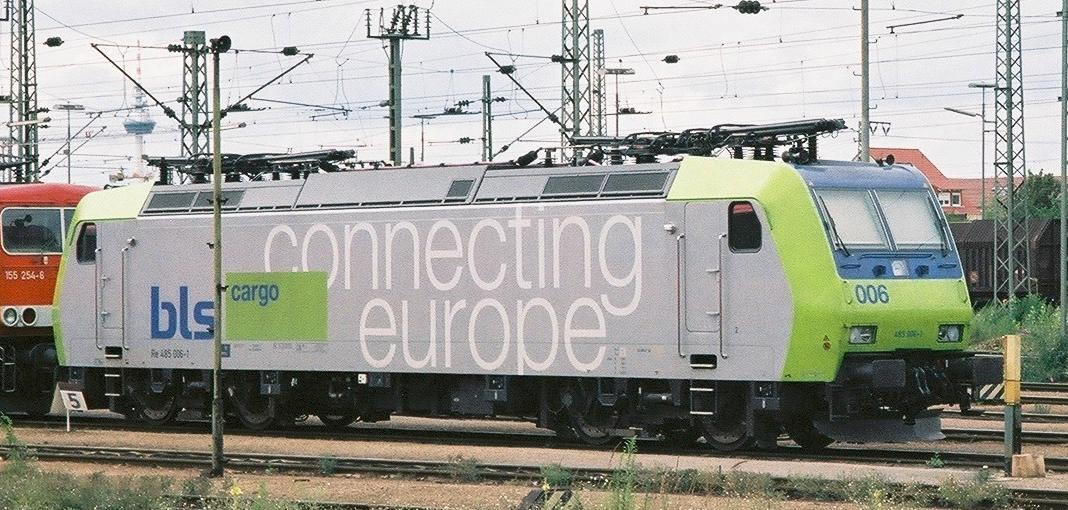
TRAXX electric locomotive

- ALP-46 - electric locomotive
- ALP-45DP - electro-diesel locomotive
- EP10 - electric locomotive
- LRC diesel locomotives
- HHP-8 - electric locomotive
- IORE - electric locomotive
- TRAXX - diesel-electric locomotive

== Passenger carriages ==
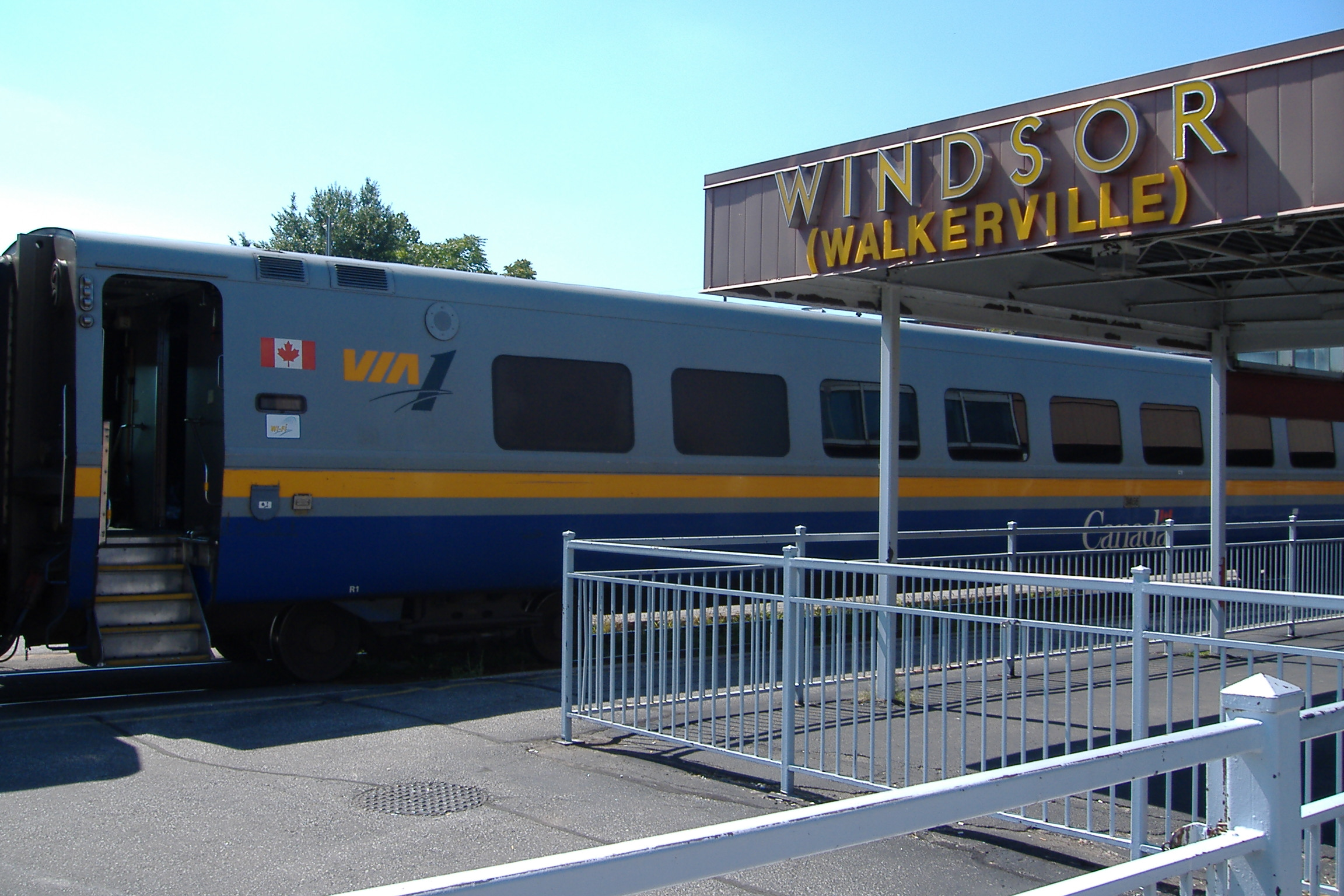
Via LRC coach

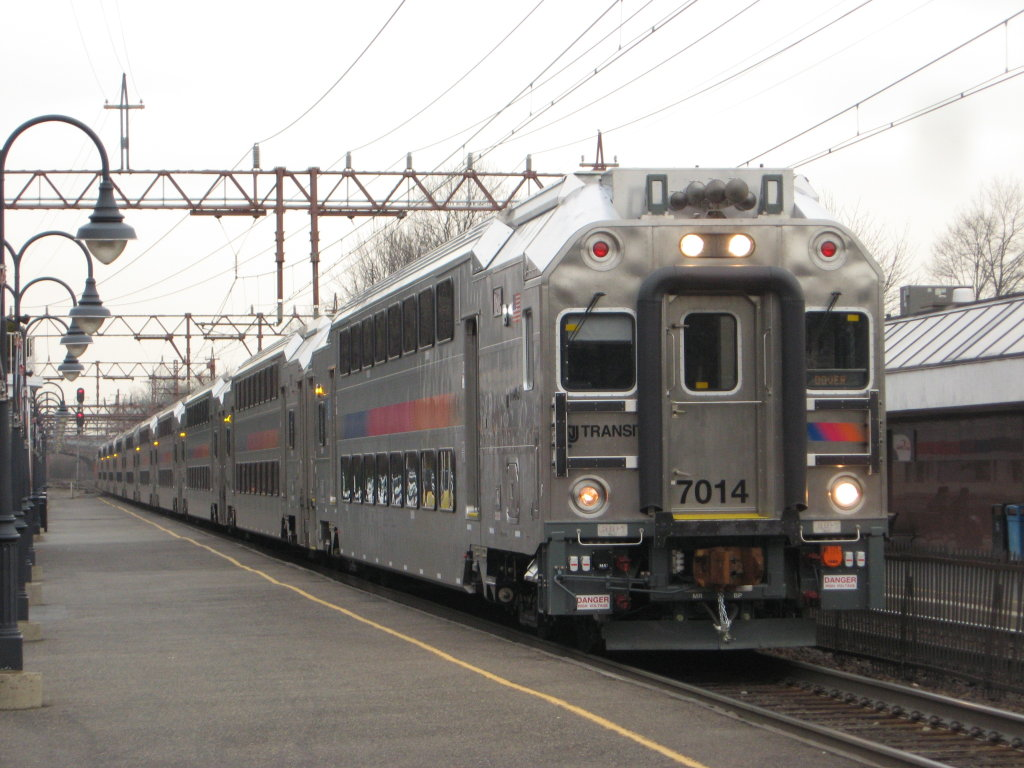
Multi-level car

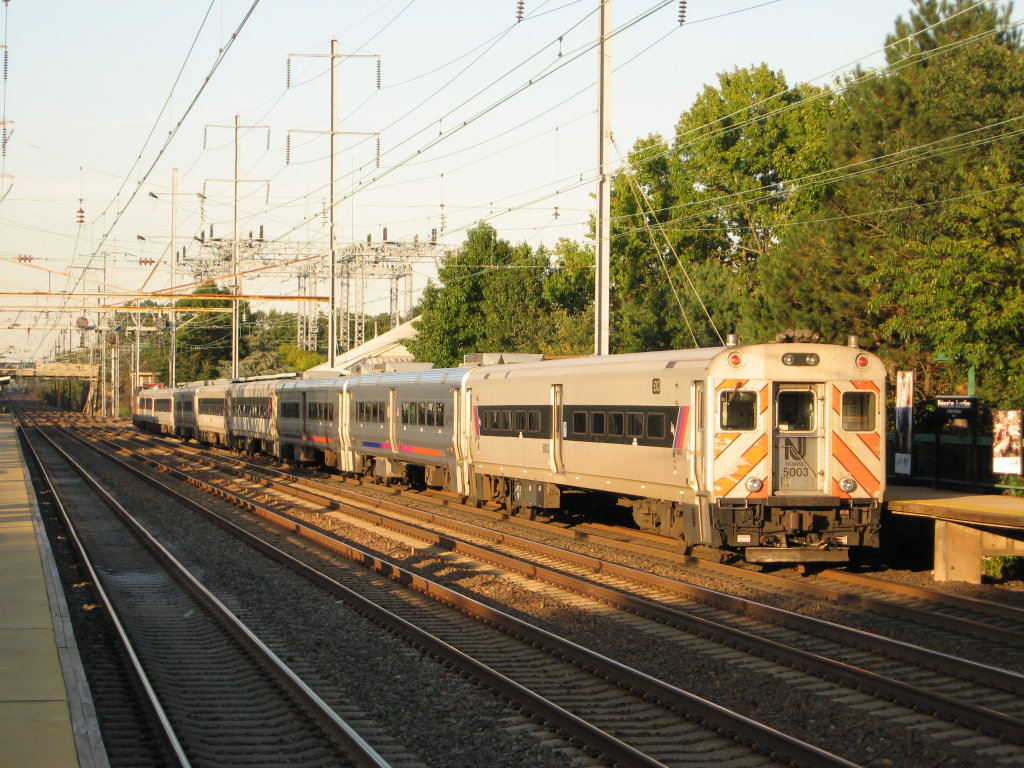
Comet III car

- BiLevel Coach - commuter rail
- MultiLevel Coach - commuter rail
- Double-deck Coach
- Comet coaches - commuter rail
- Horizon coaches
- Shoreliner coaches - commuter rail
- LRC coaches
- TwinDexx Double-Deck coach
- Superliner II cars

== Regular-speed multiple-unit trains ==
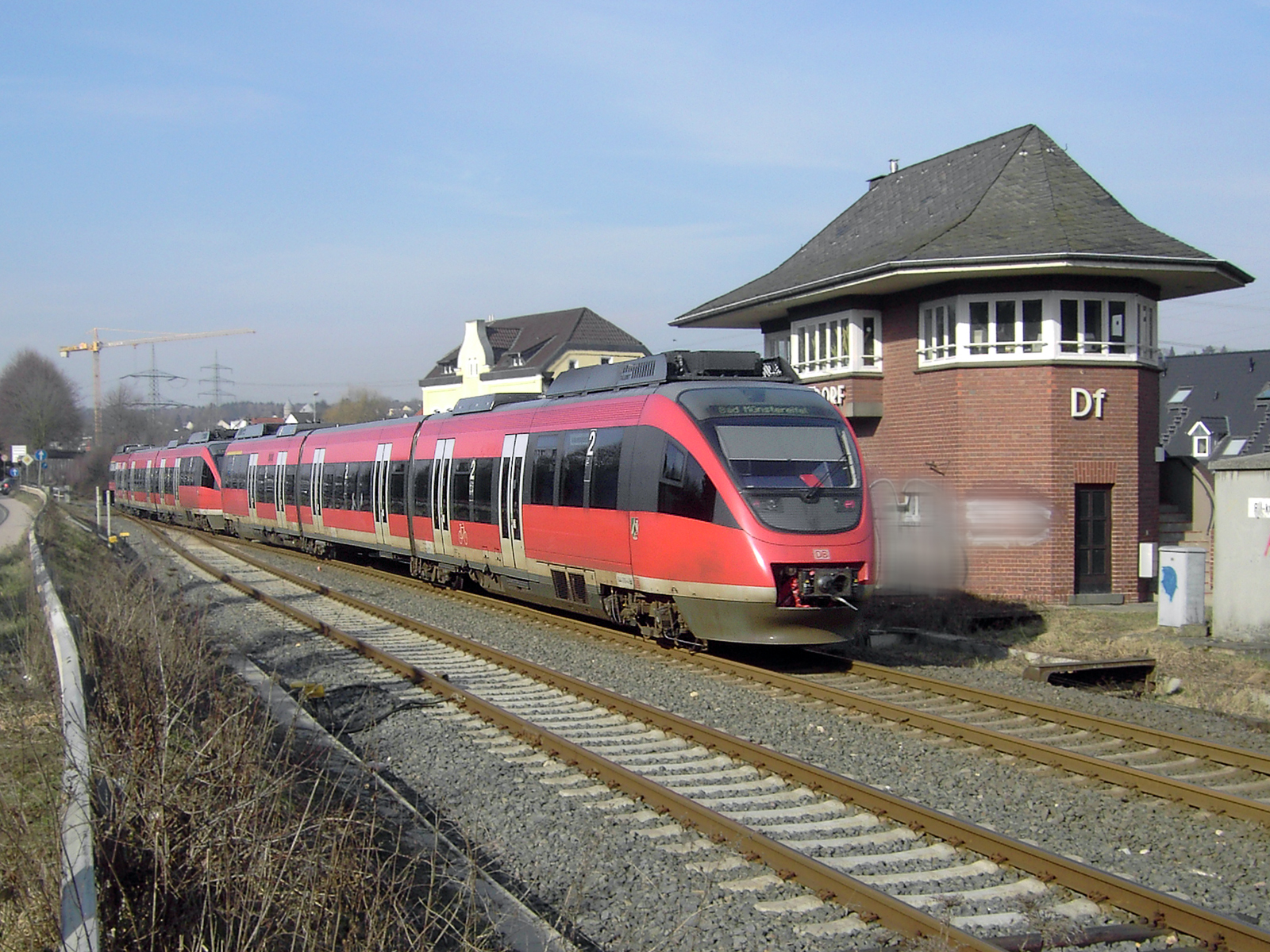
Talent DMU

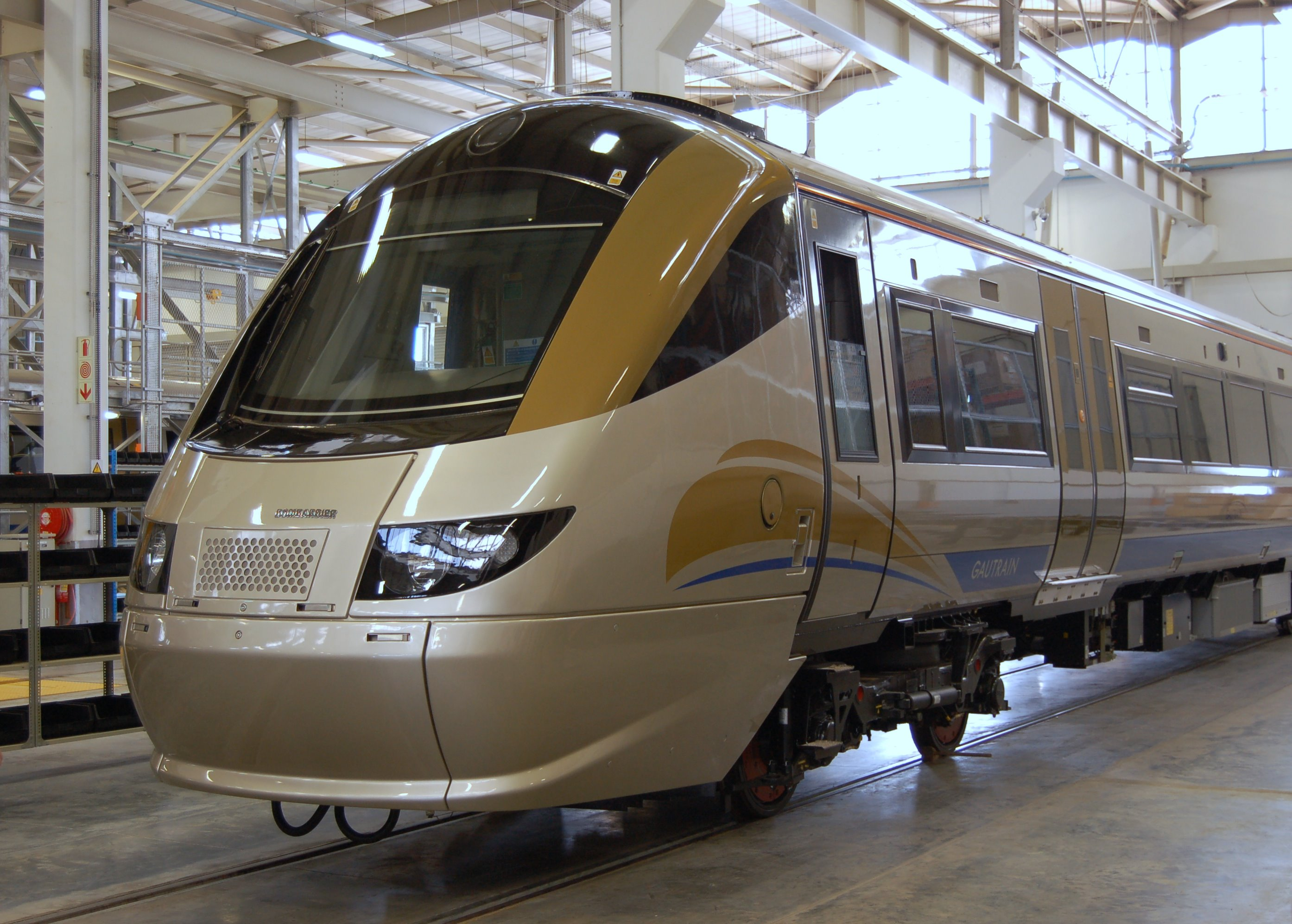
Electrostar constructed for South Africa's Gautrain

- Aventra - EMU, replacement for the Electrostar
- AGC (Autorail à grande capacité) - Dual mode or electric MU regional train
- Electrostar - EMU, (see also British Rail Classes 357, 375, 376, 377, 378, 379 and 387)
- Highliner - Double deck EMU commuter trains for Metra
- IC3 - EMU or DMU
- CP2000 (Portuguese Railways Class 3400)
- KRL i9000 - In cooperation with INKA (Industri Kereta Api) for KRL Commuterline
- M7/M7A - EMU commuter train for the Long Island Rail Road and Metro-North Railroad
- MR-90 - EMU commuter train for the Exo Deux-Montagnes line
- RegioSwinger - tilting DMU
- Talent - DMU or EMU regional train
- Talent 2 - EMU regional train
- Talent 3 - EMU regional train
- Turbostar - DMU counterpart to the Electrostar, (see also British Rail Classes 168, 170, 171 and 172)
- VLocity DMU trains for V/Line
- SNCF Class Z 50000 "Le Francilien" - EMU commuter train for the Transilien H line
- NS Sprinter Lighttrain - 4 car EMU regional rail trainset for Nederlandse Spoorwegen

== High-speed trains ==
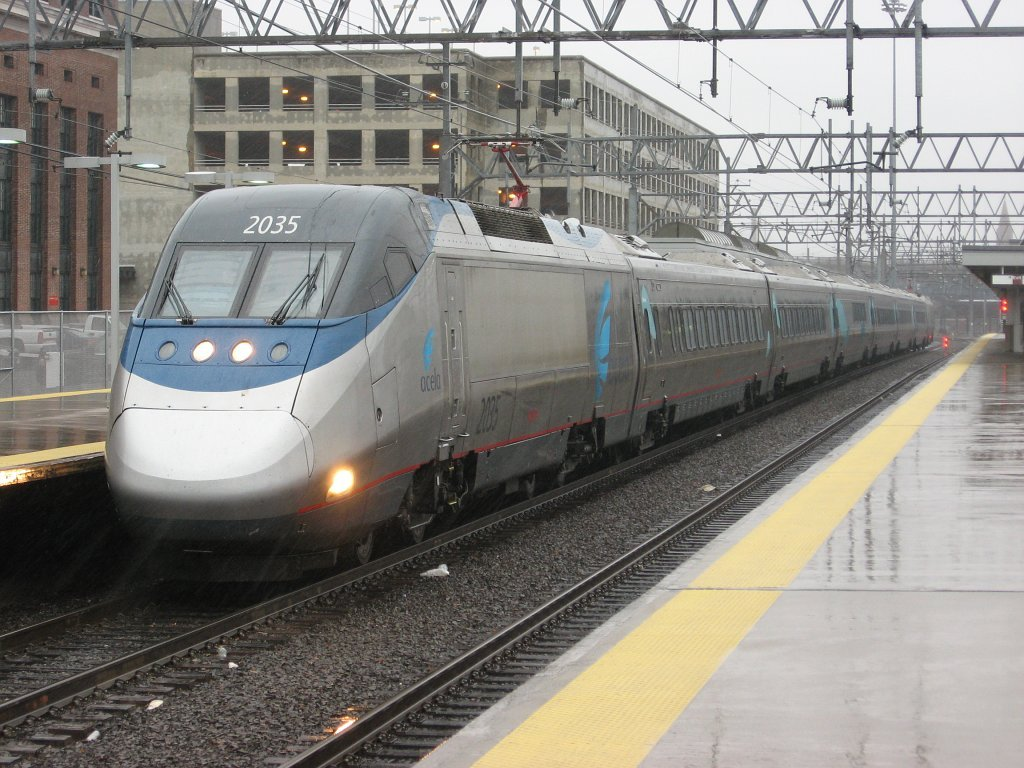
Acela Express train

- Acela Express (leader of a project in which Alstom is a participant)
- InterCityExpress (participant in a Siemens-led project)
- JetTrain (experimental)
- Regina
- Voyager, Super Voyager and Meridian diesel-electric multiple units
- Zefiro, trainsets built for the Chinese market, which have a maximum speed of 380 kilometres per hour (240 mph)
- AVE S-102 (Talgo-350) and Alvia S-130 (Talgo 250) with Talgo.

== People movers ==
- Guided Light Transit (GLT)
- INNOVIA APM

Bombardier also supplies propulsion units, train-control systems, bogies, and other parts, and maintains train fleets.

== See also ==
See List of Bombardier recreational and snow vehicles for recreational and snow vehicles and products (including outboard motors) made by Bombardier or from 2003 Bombardier Recreational Products.
