= Bombardier 3.8 =

Sailboat class

Development
- Location: Canada
- Year: 1974
- Builder: Bombardier Limited
- Name: Bombardier 3.8

Boat
- Displacement: 110 lb (50 kg)
- Draft: 2.60 ft (0.79 m)

Hull
- Type: Monohull
- Construction: Fibreglass
- LOA: 12.47 ft (3.80 m)
- Beam: 4.43 ft (1.35 m)
- Engine: none

Hull appendages
- Keel: daggerboard
- Ballast: none
- Rudder: transom-mounted rudder

Rig
- Rig type: catboat

Sails
- Sailplan: cat rig
- Mainsail area: 59.00 sq ft (5.481 m^{2})
- Total sail area: 59.00 sq ft (5.481 m^{2})

The Bombardier 3.8 is a Canadian sailing dinghy, first built in 1974.

The design is a development of the 1973 Bombardier Invitation, although smaller and lighter.

The boat was sold in Sweden as the Triss Racer.

== Production ==
The design was built by Bombardier Limited in Canada, but it is now out of production.

== Design ==
The Bombardier 3.8 is a recreational sailboat, built predominantly of fibreglass. It has an unstayed catboat rig, a raked stem, vertical transom, a wooden transom-hung rudder controlled by a tiller and a wooden daggerboard keel. It displaces 110 lb (50 kg).

The boat has a draft of 2.60 ft (0.79 m) with the daggerboard down and 0.33 ft (0.10 m) with it retracted, allowing beaching or ground transportation on a trailer or car top.

== See also ==
- List of sailing boat types

Related development

- Bombardier Invitation

Similar sailboats

- Laser (dinghy)
