= Bombardier Invitation =

Sailboat class

- Class symbol

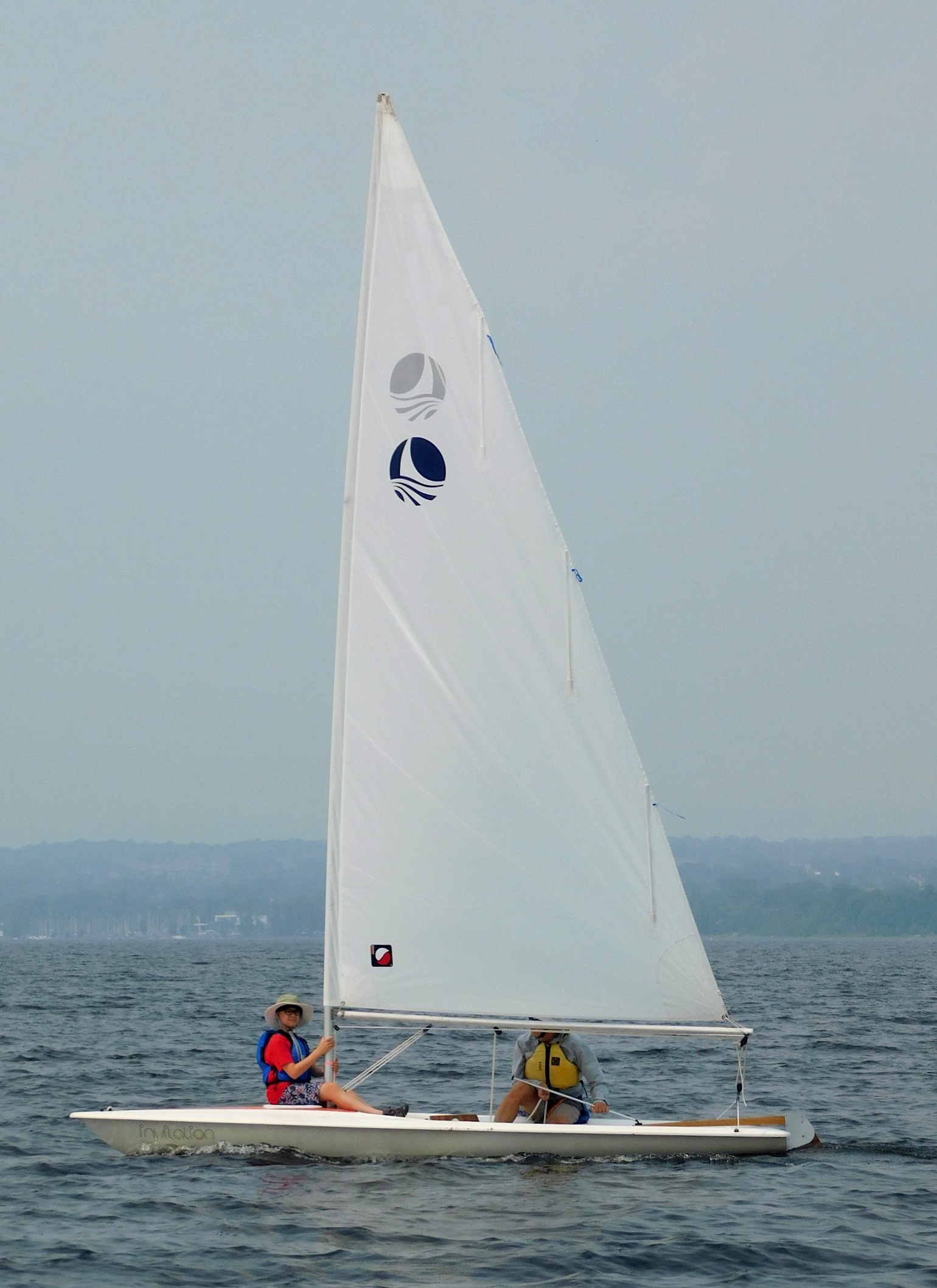

Development
- Location: Canada
- Year: 1973
- Design: Bombardier Research
- Builder: Bombardier Limited
- Role: One-design racer
- Name: Bombardier Invitation

Boat
- Displacement: 181 lb (82 kg)
- Draft: 2.99 ft (0.91 m) with the daggerboard down

Hull
- Type: Monohull
- Construction: Fibreglass
- LOA: 15.58 ft (4.75 m)
- Beam: 4.92 ft (1.50 m)

Hull appendages
- Keel: daggerboard
- Rudder: transom-mounted rudder

Rig
- Rig type: Cat rig

Sails
- Sailplan: Catboat
- Mainsail area: 90.00 sq ft (8.361 m^{2})
- Total sail area: 90.00 sq ft (8.361 m^{2})

Racing
- D-PN: 99.3

The Bombardier Invitation is a Canadian sailing dinghy that was designed by Bombardier Research to compete in the same market with the Laser, as a one-design racer. It was first built in 1973.

The design was developed into the Bombardier 3.8 in 1974.

== Production ==
The design was built by Bombardier Limited in Canada starting in 1973, but it is now out of production.

Bombardier Limited applied for a trademark of the Invitation name, for "boats and parts", on 7 December 1973. The trademark was granted on 15 November 1974, but expired on 12 January 1990 and was not renewed.

== Design ==
The Invitation is a recreational sailboat, built predominantly of fibreglass, with wood trim. It has a catboat rig with aluminum spars and a loose-footed mainsail. The hull has built-in foam for buoyancy. The sail is without sail battens, is installed over the two-piece mast with a sewn-in sleeve and can be wrapped around the mast. The hull has an enclosed foredeck, a spooned raked stem, a vertical transom, a wooden, kick-up, transom-hung rudder controlled by a tiller with a hiking stick and a retractable wooden daggerboard. The hull alone displaces 180 lb (82 kg).

The boat has a draft of 2.99 ft (0.91 m) with the daggerboard extended. Retracting the daggerboard allows beaching or ground transportation on a trailer or car roof rack.

For sailing the design is equipped with hiking straps, an adjustable outhaul, a boom vang and a vacuum bailer.

The design has a Portsmouth Yardstick racing average handicap of 99.3 and is normally raced with a crew of one or two sailors.

== Operational history ==
In a 1994 review Richard Sherwood described the Invitation as, "a boat designed for ease in cartopping, with two-piece mast and overhanging two-inch gunwale to assist lifting ... [the] Invitation is a one-design with rigid class rules."

== See also ==
- List of sailing boat types

Related development

- Bombardier 3.8

Similar sailboats

- Laser (dinghy)
