= Bombardier Bombi =

Snowmobile

The Bombardier Bombi or BR 100 is a small dual tracked vehicle which is used for grooming ski and snowmobile trails. Its weight is around 900 kg. it measures approximately 2.7(9 ft) x 1.8 meters (6 ft).

As a result of its wide tracks, [58 cm (23 inches) in winter and 45 cm (18 inches) in summer], it exerts as little as 0.54 and 0.70 psi of ground pressure at 125 mm (6 inches) penetration and it can operate on 60% horizontal and 80% vertical slopes; its top speed is 20 mph or 32 km/h. This is achieved with a 1.6 litre or 98 cu. in. 57 hp. inline four cylinder Ford industrial engine, the same as that used in the Ford Cortina.
