= John Deere Buck =

All-terrain vehicle

The John Deere Buck was John Deere's all-terrain vehicle, introduced in 2004 as a 2005 model. The model was produced by Bombardier in a partnership between the two companies. The Buck was powered by a 500-cc or 650-cc Rotax engine. It was not continued for the 2007 model year.

== See also ==
- John Deere Tractor
- John Deere
- John Deere (inventor)
