= Sea-Doo =

Canadian boats and personal watercraft

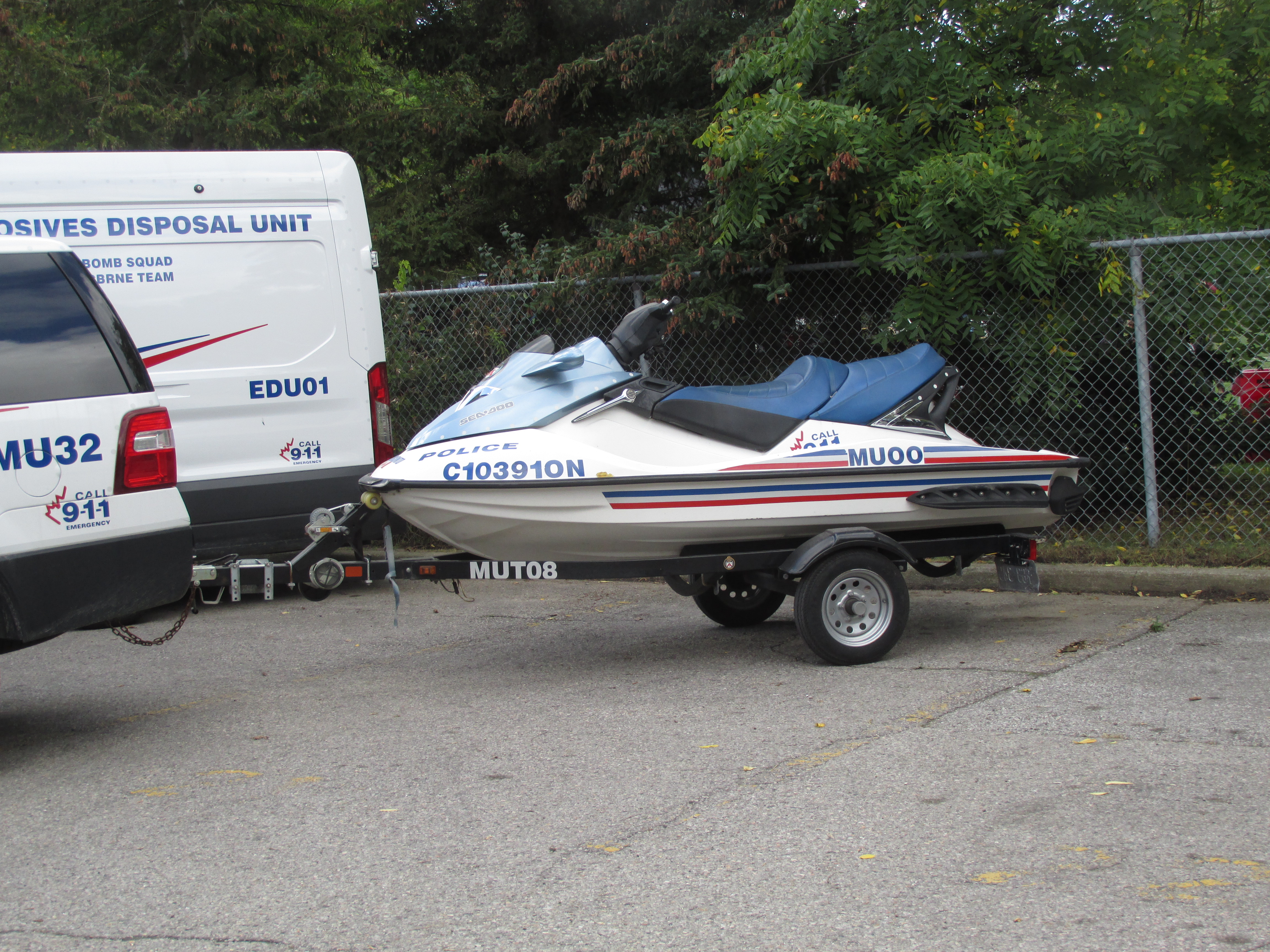
- Toronto Police rescue unit.
- Product type: Personal watercraft
- Produced by: Bombardier Recreational Products
- Country: Canada
- Introduced: 1968; 58 years ago
- Related brands: Sea-Doo XP, Ski-Doo
- Markets: Worldwide
- Website: sea-doo.brp.com

Sea-Doo is a Canadian brand of personal watercraft (PWC) and boats manufactured by Bombardier Recreational Products (BRP). All Sea-Doo models are driven by an impeller-driven waterjet. All Sea-Doo PWC models are produced at BRP's plants in Querétaro and Juárez, Mexico. Its Rotax engines are produced at BRP's plant in Gunskirchen, Austria. In 2016, Sea-Doo had a 45.8% share of the PWC market in the US. It competed primarily with Kawasaki's Jet Ski, Yamaha's WaveRunner, Elaqua's E-PWC and Honda's AquaTrax.

== History ==
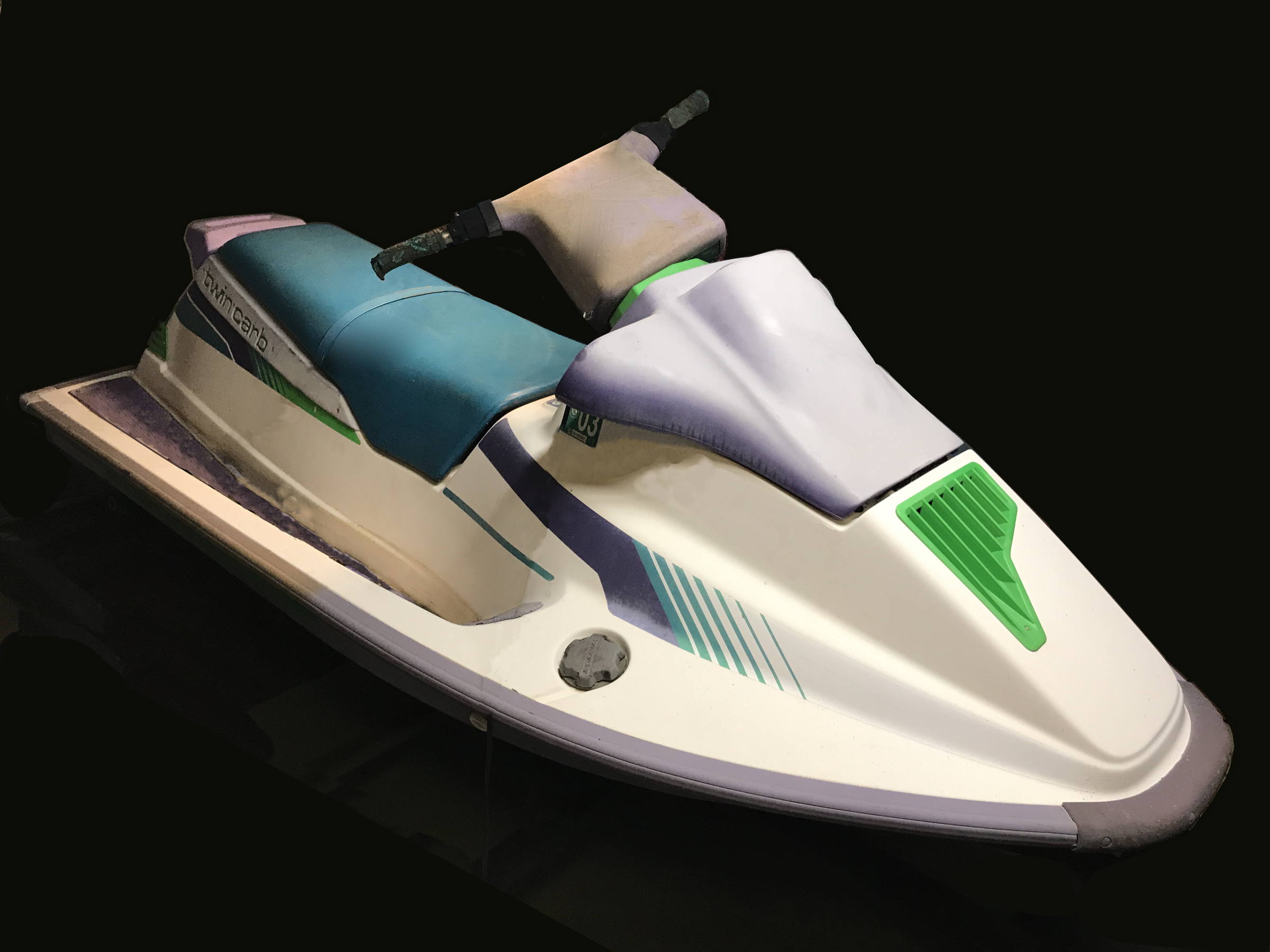
1992 SeaDoo XP generation one, the original high-performance runabout style PWC.

Bombardier introduced its first personal watercraft in 1968, called the Bombardier Sea-Doo. It was designed by Clayton Jacobson II, who would later develop the more successful Kawasaki Jet Ski (brand) watercraft. Also heavily involved was Bombardier's Laurent Beaudoin, who was interested in expanding the success of the Ski-Doo snowmobile to the PWC market. Advertised as the "Jet-powered Aqua Scooter", the original yellow Sea-Doo was 5 feet wide and 7.5 feet long, somewhat resembling a flying saucer. In 1968, it was powered by an air-cooled, 320cc engine with a top speed of 25 mph. Following complaints of overheating and inefficiency, it was replaced in 1969 with a water-cooled 372cc engine. There were common complaints about discomfort from its flat seat and minimally-padded Ski-Doo supplied stainless steel handlebars. After only two years on the market, it was discontinued.

The Sea-Doo was re-introduced in 1988 as its own brand under Bombardier. By 1995, annual sales for the Sea-Doo reached over 100,000 units, signaling a turnaround in the company's declining sales. By 1997 the company had $212 million in sales, recapturing over half of the PWC market.

== Models ==
There are five categories of Sea-Doo models: recreation, tow sports, touring, sport fishing, and performance.

The Sea-Doo jet-powered sport boats included a four-seater Sportster 150 with 155 hp or 215 hp, a four-seater Speedster 150 with 255 hp, and a seven-seater Speedster 200 with 310 hp, and a Speedster 230 with space for up to twelve people. The Wake 200 model was made for wakeboarding and the two Challenger models were less sporty and more luxurious: a smaller Challenger 180 and a larger Challenger 210. In 2012, BRP discontinued sport boat production, citing a decline in global sales in the marine industry. This meant the loss of 350 jobs, including most of those at a plant in Benton, Illinois.

The Sea-Doo Spark which was released in 2014 was aimed to attract new buyers to the decreasing PWC market. This model was in development for eight years and was code-named CAFE (clean, affordable, fun, and easy to use). It used a unique polytec hull and deck structure to cut costs and weight. The Spark quickly became the best-selling Sea-Doo model.

In August 2021 they released a pontoon boat style boat called the Switch.

== See also ==
- Sea-Doo XP
- Sea-Doo Hydrocross – PlayStation video-game
- Ski-Doo – snowmobile
