= Sea-Doo XP =

Model of personal watercraft

- Product type: Personal watercraft
- Produced by: Bombardier Recreational Products
- Country: Canada
- Introduced: 1991
- Discontinued: 2004
- Related brands: Sea-Doo
- Markets: Worldwide
- Website: https://www.sea-doo.com

The Sea-Doo XP was a model of personal watercraft produced by Bombardier Recreational Products from 1991 to 2004. The Sea-Doo XP is a significant model in that it was the first high performance version of a sit-down style watercraft to be offered by any manufacturer. Since the craft's introduction, all other personal watercraft manufacturers have introduced and continue to offer high performance versions of their standard runabouts. In 2000, the XP was named Watercraft of the Century by Watercraft World magazine. During the 13 years it was available there were four generational changes resulting in design and performance improvements along with power increases from 55HP to 130HP.

== First generation: 1991-1992 ==
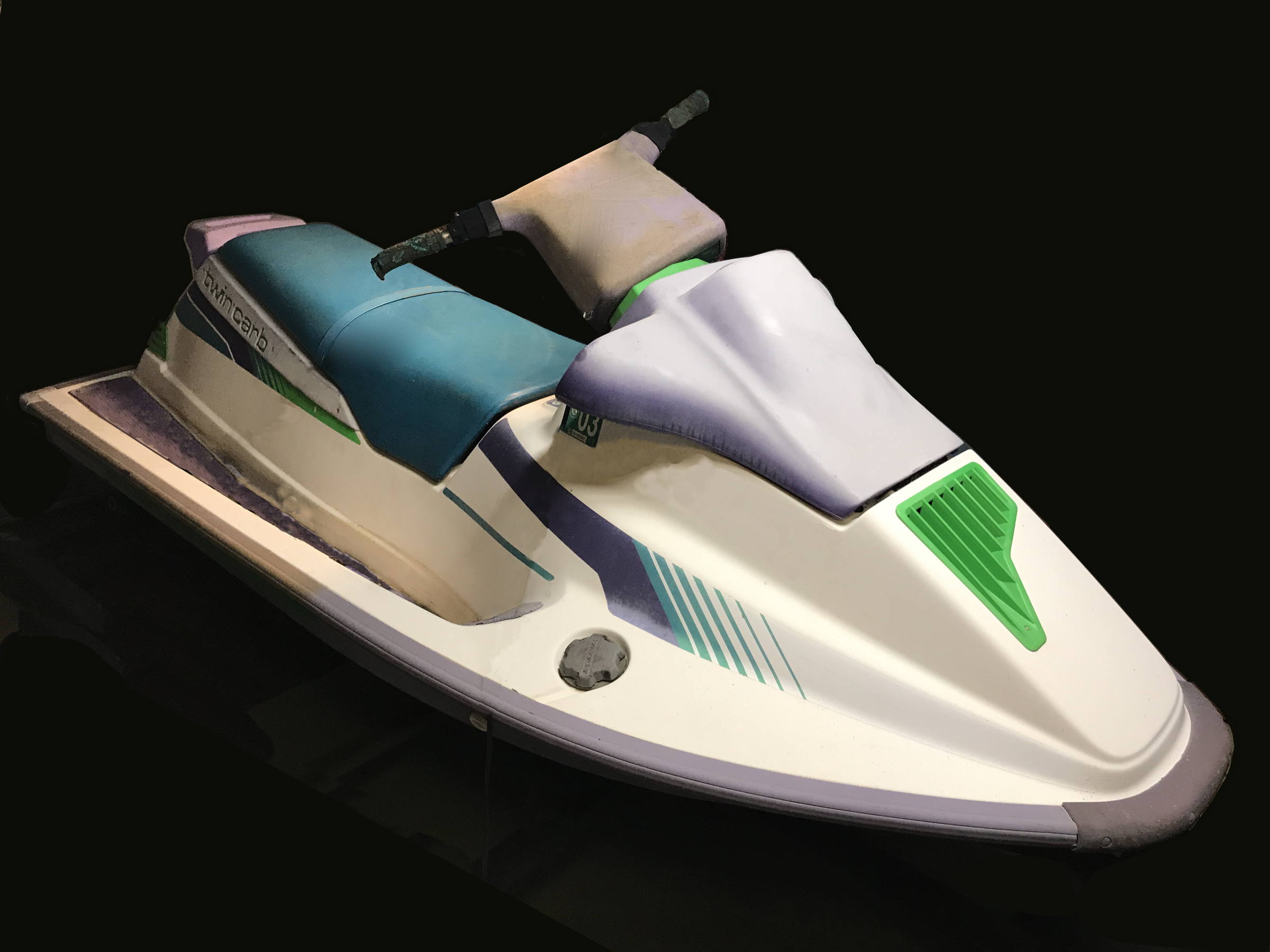
1992 SeaDoo XP generation one, the original high performance runabout style personal watercraft. Powered by the 587 model motor.

The 1991-1992 XP was based on Sea-Doo's original hull introduced in 1988. In the XP, the SP's 580cc Rotax engine was upgraded with dual carburetors and a tuned exhaust pipe. The 91 had the original yellow motor and the 92 was upgraded to the white motor. The jet pump featured a stainless steel impeller. Visually, the XP featured a purple lower hull, pump, seat, cowling, and handle pole cover. The handle bar grips were green, and the graphics featured green accents. Also a first among watercraft, the cowling featured fixed dual mirrors and a pod for fuel gauge and tachometer on the top. The 1991 XP was named "Watercraft of the Year".

The motor & pump upgrades help the XP to reach speeds of 44 to 46 mph in magazine tests—the fastest of that time. The handling was characterized by the "lean out" riding style of all early Sea-Doos.

== Second generation: 1993-1994 ==
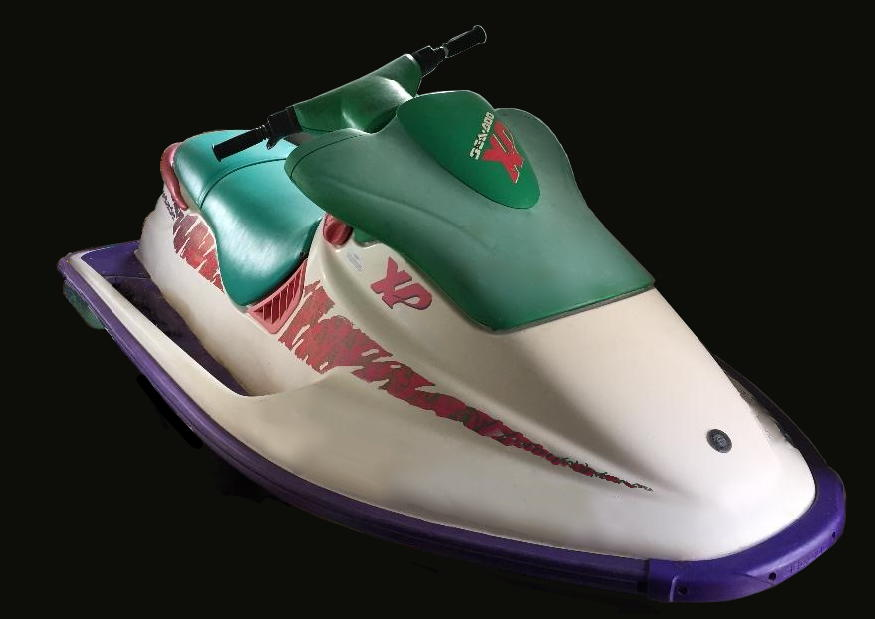
1993 SeaDoo XP generation two, high performance runabout style PWC. Powered by the 657 model motor.

The 1993–1994 XP was based on Sea-Doo's second generation SP hull.

The 1993 model was powered by a 650cc Rotax engine with dual carburetors and a tuned exhaust pipe and produced 70HP. A variable trim nozzle and bronze vanes were added to the jet pump. The hull, seat, cowling, and handlebar cover were now green, while the grips, intake grills, and boarding handle were red. The deck was white, and graphic accents were now red as well. Adjustable mirrors were added to the cowling.

1994 models were almost the same as the 93s except for some minor graphic changes and an increase in horsepower due to some carb and timing changes on the 657x version of the Rotax engine. However, the 93s did not have sponsons which greatly hurt performance. Seadoo offered a kit which included long GTX style sponsons to be mounted to the hull. This improved handling immensely, but sacrificed some top speed.

== Third generation: 1995-1996 ==
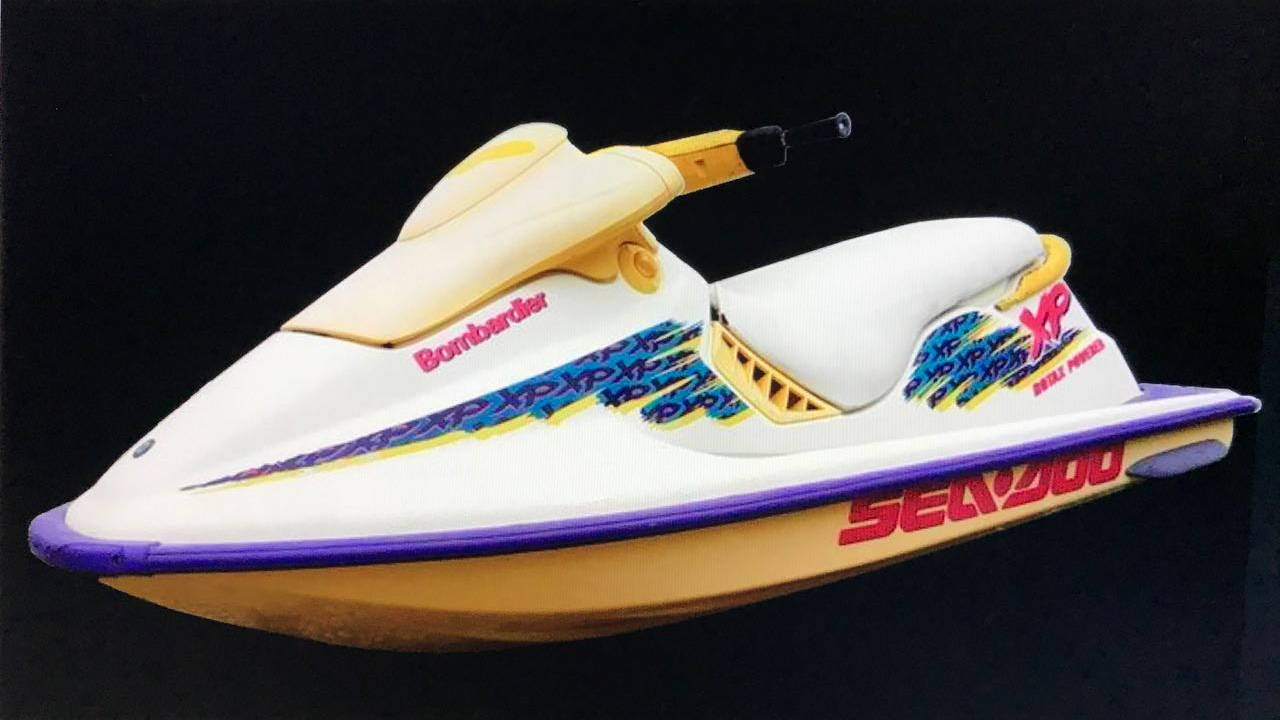
1995 SeaDoo XP generation three, high performance runabout style PWC sporting the X-4 hull. Powered by the 717 and 787 model motors.

For 1995, the XP sported the new X-4 hull which was based on race hulls used the previous year. The hull was extended at the rear, narrowed at the bow, and sponsons were added on both sides of the stern. The X-4 hull handled far superior to the previous hulls. It had removable trim tabs at the rear which could be shimmed with a kit offered over the counter to trim the hull as desired. Also, a 4 inch long pump spacer was added in front of the pump. While this spacer added slightly to the top speed, it hurt performance in rough water because of the extra time it took to fill the increased volume with water once the pump came unhooked. The engine's displacement was again increased, now to 720cc, rated at 85 horsepower. The 95s used the same upper deck as 94s, aside of some color and graphic changes. The graphics theme moved from green and red to yellow and purple, with the hull, seat, intake grills, cowling and handle pole cover becoming yellow, while the grips, boarding handle, rub rail and traction mats became to purple. The deck remained white.

A limited-edition model, the XP 800, was offered in 1995 as well. The 800 model featured a 110HP engine based on BRP's snowmobile motors. The new engine was 782cc and was equipped with pressure operated variable exhaust port timing valves, or (Rotax Automatic Variable Exhaust) R.A.V.E. valves, dual carburetors, and a tuned, variable water injected expansion chamber, which helped the XP 800 reach speeds of 59 mph. The 800 was also differentiated by a yellow hull, top deck, seat, cowling and handle pole cover. The cowling had a single gauge and no mirrors. The rear of the hull was pink, and the graphic accents were pink.

The 1996 XP carried over many of the features of the XP 800; the Type 787 R.A.V.E. valve 110HP motor, the trim strips, and had yellow upper and lower hulls. The standard XP cowling with adjustable mirrors and gauges returned. The graphic accents were pink, but the rear hull was left yellow.

The handling of all the third generation boats was still characterized by the "lean out" riding style.

== Fourth generation: 1997-2004 ==
The 1997 XP was a marked departure from the previous models. An all new hull specific to the XP was developed which brought a "lean in" style of riding to the craft. Further enhancing this was Sea-Doo's "Direct Action Suspension," a raised seat that was mounted on a pivot and had a shock absorber at the opposite end. The 110HP 782cc engine was carried over, as was the predominantly yellow with black accents color scheme. The 1997 boat was over 90 lbs heavier than the 1996 boat, which resulted in slower acceleration from the previous year although realizing a top speed gain by about 1 mph. Nonetheless, the riding experience was enough for the XP to win WaterCraft World's Watercraft of the Year award in 1997. For 1998, the power to weight issue was solved by the new XP Limited model. This craft was powered by a 951cc (called a Type 947) engine with reed valves on the intake and R.A.V.E. valves on the exhaust. The new engine produced 130HP and pushed the 1998 XP to 60 mph. Graphically, the lower hull, cowling, and handle pole cover were now black, and the hood and cowling pod were metallic gray.

The 1999 XP Limited mainly featured graphic changes, as the hull colorings remained unchanged from 1998. Many driveline upgrades were incorporated due to previous failures in the couplings.

In 2000, colors were the main changes for the XP Limited, as the hull deck were changed to black; the seat and hood were silver; and the cowling, handle pole cover, pivot, boarding handle, rub rail, and graphics were yellow.

2001 saw another color variation, with the hull remaining black while the top deck, hood, and seat became silver. The rub rail, pivots, and boarding handling were yellow, and the instrument pod and handle pole cover were black.

The 2002 XP Limited saw yet another graphic variation. The hood and boarding handle were black along with the hull, instrument pod, and handle pole cover; the deck remained silver; and the seat was now yellow along like the cowling and pivot points.

The "Limited" tag was dropped from 2003 and 2004 XPs and DI, for direct injection, was added. Orbital direct fuel injection was added to the 951 cc engine for improved fuel economy, performance, and emissions. The XP DIs were given a whole new color scheme: red hull, deck, cowling, and handle pole cover; black hood, pivots, rub rail, and boarding handle; and a silver seat.

== Dimensions ==
Model Year	Length	Width	Height	Weight	Fuel	Load Limit	Motor	HP	MPH
1991	244 cm/96in	105 cm/41.5in	92 cm/36.2in	166 kg/365 lbs	33 L/8.7 gal	160 kg/353 lbs	580 cc	55	45
1992	244 cm/96in	105 cm/41.5in	92 cm/36.2in	166 kg/365 lbs	33 L/8.7 gal	160 kg/353 lbs	580 cc	60	45
1993	256 cm/100in	105 cm/41.5in	92 cm/36.2in	170 kg/373 lbs	33 L/8.7 gal	160 kg/353 lbs	650 cc	70	48
1994	256 cm/100in	105 cm/41.5in	92 cm/36.2in	187 kg/413 lbs	33 L/8.7 gal	160 kg/353 lbs	650 cc	80	48
1995	262 cm/103in	105 cm/41.3in	92 cm/36.2in	197 kg/434 lbs	34 L/9.0 gal	160 kg/353 lbs	720 cc	85	50
1996	262 cm/103in	105 cm/41.3in	92 cm/36.2in	197 kg/434 lbs	34 L/9.0 gal	160 kg/353 lbs	782 cc	110	56
1997	272 cm/107in	112 cm/44in	103 cm/40.5in	239 kg/525 lbs	41.5 L/11 gal	159 kg/350 lbs	782 cc	110	56
1998	272 cm/107in	112 cm/44in	103 cm/40.5in	250 kg/551 lbs	55 L/14 gal	159 kg/350 lbs	951 cc	130	60
1999	272 cm/107in	112 cm/44in	103 cm/40.5in	250 kg/551 lbs	55 L/14 gal	159 kg/350 lbs	951 cc	130	60
2000	272 cm/107in	112 cm/44in	104 cm/41in	255 kg/562 lbs	55 L/14 gal	159 kg/350 lbs	951 cc	130	60
2001	272 cm/107in	112 cm/44.1in	104 cm/41in	255 kg/562 lbs	55 L/14 gal	159 kg/350 lbs	951 cc	130	60
2002	272 cm/107in	122 cm/48in	104 cm/41in	255 kg/562 lbs	55 L/14 gal	159 kg/350 lbs	951 cc	130	60
2003	272 cm/107in	122 cm/48in	104 cm/41in	274 kg/625 lbs	51 L/13 gal	159 kg/350 lbs	951 cc	130	60
2004	272 cm/107in	113 cm/44.5in	91 cm/35.8in	273 kg/600 lbs	51 L/13 gal	159 kg/350 lbs	951 cc	130	60
