= 2006 New Year Honours =

British royal recognitions

The New Year Honours 2006 in some Commonwealth realms were announced (on 31 December 2005) in the United Kingdom, New Zealand, Grenada, the Solomon Islands, Tuvalu, Saint Vincent and the Grenadines, Belize, and Saint Christopher and Nevis to celebrate the year past and mark the beginning of 2006.

The recipients of honours are displayed here as they were styled before their new honour, and arranged firstly by the country whose ministers advised the Queen on the appointments, then by honour, with classes (Knight, Knight Grand Cross, etc.) and then divisions (Military, Civil, etc.) as appropriate.

== United Kingdom ==
=== Knights Bachelor ===
- Professor John Macleod Ball, Sedleian Professor of Natural Philosophy, University of Oxford. For services to Science.
- Professor Ivor Martin Crewe, DL, Vice-Chancellor, University of Essex and Lately President, Universities UK. For services to Higher Education.
- John Dankworth, CBE, Jazz Musician. For services to Music.
- Christopher Fox, QPM, President, Association of Chief Police Officers. For services to the Police.
- William Benjamin Bowring Gammell, Chief Executive, Cairn Energy plc. For services to Industry in Scotland.
- David Michael Hart, OBE, lately General-Secretary, National Association of Head Teachers. For services to Education.
- Ian Bernard Vaughan Magee, CB, Second Permanent Secretary, Department for Constitutional Affairs.
- Dr. Allen James McClay, CBE, Chairman, ALMAC and chairman, Queen's University of Belfast Foundation. For services to Business and to Charity in Northern Ireland.
- Keith Mills, Chief Executive, London 2012. For services to Sport.
- Simon Milton, leader, Westminster City Council. For services to Local Government.
- Adrian Alastair Montague, CBE, Chairman, British Energy. For services to the Nuclear and Electricity Industries.
- Stephen Alan Moss, lately Director of Nursing and Patient Services, Queen's Medical Centre, Nottingham. For services to the NHS.
- Professor Michael Pepper, Professor of Physics, University of Cambridge. For services to Physics.
- Craig Collins Reedie, CBE, lately chairman, British Olympic Association. For services to Sport.
- John Henry Ritblat, Chairman, The British Land Company and Chairman of the Trustees, Wallace Collection. For services to the Arts.
- Michael Berry Savory, lately Lord Mayor of the City of London. For services to the City of London.
- Stephen Ashley Sherbourne, CBE, lately Chief of Staff to the Leader of the Opposition.
- Roger Singleton, CBE, lately Chief Executive, Barnardo's. For services to Children.
- Professor Graham Michael Teasdale, President, Royal College of Physicians and Surgeons of Glasgow. For services to Neurosurgery and victims of head injuries.
- David Robert Varney, Permanent Secretary, HM Revenue and Customs.
- Arnold Wesker, Playwright/Director. For services to Drama.
- Thomas Jones Woodward ("Tom Jones"), OBE, Singer. For services to Music.
- Professor Nicholas Alcwyn Wright, Warden, Barts and the London, Queen Mary School of Medicine. For services to Medicine.

=== Order of the Bath ===
==== Knights Grand Cross of the Order of the Bath (GCB) ====
Civil Division

- Sir Richard Clive Mottram, KCB, Security and Intelligence Co-ordinator, Cabinet Office.

==== Knights Commander of the Order of the Bath (KCB) ====
Military Division

Air Force

- Air Marshal Clive Robert Loader, OBE, Royal Air Force.

Civil Division

- Sumantra Chakrabarti, Permanent Secretary, Department for International Development.

==== Companions of the Order of the Bath (CB) ====
Military Division

Navy

- The Venerable Barry Keith Hammett, QHC
- Rear Admiral James Campsie Rapp.

Army

- Major General Anthony John Raper, CBE (489583), late Royal Corps of Signals.

Air Force

- Air Vice-Marshal Stephen Gary George Dalton, Royal Air Force.
- Air Vice-Marshal Paul Douglas Luker, OBE, AFC, Royal Air Force.

Civil Division

- Gregor Munro Clark, Scottish Parliamentary Counsel, Scottish Executive.
- Dr. Paul Charles Davies, JP, Chief Scientist, Health and Safety Executive.
- Henry Clifford Sydney Derwent, director, Climate Change and Environment, Department for Environment, Food and Rural Affairs.
- Richard Philip Douglas, Finance Director, Department of Health.
- Michael John Eland, Director-General of Law Enforcement and Compliance, HM Revenue and Customs.
- Andrew John Lebrecht, Director-General, Sustainable Farming, Food and Fisheries, Department for Environment, Food and Rural Affairs.
- Bryan James Mitchell, lately Head, Business and Information Management Directorate, National Assembly for Wales.
- Leslie Samuel Ross, lately managing director, Business International, Invest NI, Northern Ireland Executive.
- Helen Williams, director, Schools Standards Group, Department for Education and Skills.

Diplomatic Division

- Iain Robert Lobban, Director of Operations, GCHQ.

=== Order of Saint Michael and Saint George ===
==== Knights Grand Cross of the Order of St. Michael and St. George (GCMG) ====
Diplomatic Division

- Jeremy John Durham (Paddy), Baron Ashdown of Norton-sub-Hamdon, KBE, PC, lately High Representative of the International Community in Bosnia and Herzegovina.

==== Knights Commander of the Order of St. Michael and St. George (KCMG) ====
Diplomatic Division

- Graham Holbrook Fry, HM Ambassador, Tokyo.
- Francis Geoffrey Jacobs, QC, lately Advocate General, European Court of Justice.
- Stephen John Leadbetter Wright, CMG, HM Ambassador, Madrid.

==== Companions of the Order of St. Michael and St. George (CMG) ====
Civil Division

- John Nicholas Beadle, Senior Civil Servant, Ministry of Defence.

Diplomatic Division

- Robin Anthony Barnett, Director UK Visas, Foreign and Commonwealth Office.
- James David Bevan, Director Africa, Foreign and Commonwealth Office.
- Robert Edward Brinkley, HM Ambassador, Kyiv.
- Richard Andrew Foulsham, lately Counsellor, Foreign and Commonwealth Office.
- Dr. Richard Peter Phillips, Programme Director, British Council.
- Professor Patrick Thornberry. For services to international human rights.
- David Kevin Woodward, President, BP Azerbaijan. For services to British business interests and security of energy supplies.
- Heather Jacqueline Yasamee, Counsellor, Foreign and Commonwealth Office.

=== Royal Victorian Order ===
==== Knights Commander of the Royal Victorian Order (KCVO) ====
- Colonel James Stirling of Garden, CBE, TD, Lord-Lieutenant of Stirling and Falkirk.

==== Commanders of the Royal Victorian Order (CVO) ====
- Sister Judith Ellen Dean, OBE, Trustee, The Duke of Edinburgh's Award (International).
- Richard Marriott, TD, formerly Lord-Lieutenant of the East Riding of Yorkshire.
- Walter Robert Alexander Ross, Secretary and Keeper of the Records, Duchy of Cornwall.

==== Lieutenants of the Royal Victorian Order (LVO) ====
- Patric Dickinson, Secretary, Order of the Garter.
- John Heaslip, Chief Executive, Business in the Community, Northern Ireland.
- Major Charles Rowland Marriott, Clerk of the Cheque and Adjutant, Yeomen of the Guard.
- Nuala Patricia McGourty, Retail Director, Royal Collection.
- Lieutenant Colonel Anthony Charles Richards, MVO, Deputy Master of the Household and Equerry to The Queen.
- The Honourable Rowena Margaret Sanders, Lady in Waiting to Princess Michael of Kent.
- Fiona Sara Shackleton, formerly Solicitor to The Prince of Wales.
- Gwendoline Annette Wilkin, MVO, Housekeeper, Windsor Castle.
- Colin Williams, OBE, formerly Director, Scotland, The Princess Royal Trust for Carers.

==== Members of the Royal Victorian Order (MVO) ====
- Stephen M. Chapman (photographer), Senior Photographer, Royal Collection.
- Karen Crawford, formerly Protocol Officer, Visits Section, Scottish Executive.
- Richard John Dilworth. For services to The Duke of York's Household.
- Mark William Barry Galloway Dyer. For services to The Prince of Wales and The Duchess of Cornwall's Household.
- Sergeant Ian David Huggett, Metropolitan Police. For services to Royalty Protection.
- Pamela MacDonald, Payroll Manager, The Prince of Wales and The Duchess of Cornwall's Household.
- Julie Christine Moyes, RVM, Housekeeper, Balmoral Castle.
- Sergeant Phelim Patrick O'Higgins, Metropolitan Police. For services to Royalty Protection.
- Pamela Edith Tantony, formerly Assistant Keeper of the Records, Duchy of Lancaster.
- Inspector Christopher John Tarr, Metropolitan Police. For services to Royalty Protection.
- Paul Kevin Whybrew, RVM, The Queen's Page, Royal Household.

=== Royal Victorian Medal ===
==== Royal Victorian Medal (Gold) ====
- David John Watts, RVM, formerly Carpenter, Sandringham Estate.

==== Bar to the Royal Victorian Medal (Silver) ====
- David John Middleton, RVM, Chief Upholsterer, Royal Household.

==== Royal Victorian Medal (Silver) ====
- Constable Allister Saville Brown, Metropolitan Police. For services to Royalty Protection.
- Robert Houston Brown, formerly The Queen's Flagman and Orderly.
- Marine Benjamin Brady, Royal Marines 42 Commando
- Janet Margaret Doel, The Queen's Housemaid, Windsor Castle.
- Jeremy Graham Gale, Craft Technician, C Branch, Royal Household.
- Darren Ashley Gallacher, Fruit Farm Worker, Sandringham Estate.
- Gary David Ganley, Carpet Planner, Windsor Castle.
- Greta Greenwood, Dining Room Supervisor, Royal Household.
- Francis Edmund Harris, Palace Attendant, Buckingham Palace.
- James Mills, Footman, Buckingham Palace.
- Pamela Ann Hayes, formerly The Duke of Edinburgh's Senior Housemaid, Windsor Castle.
- Gary Philip Jones, Fendersmith, Windsor Castle.
- Alan Melton, Forestry Foreman, Sandringham Estate.
- Mark Andrew Perry, Gamekeeper, Sandringham Estate.
- Gary Robertson, Leading Porter/Craft Assistant, Palace of Holyroodhouse.
- David James Rough, Leading Palace Attendant, Buckingham Palace.
- Anthony Charles Fitt-Savage, formerly Organist, Sandringham Church.
- Michael Robert Sykes, Chief Carpet Planner, Buckingham Palace.
- Peter David Anthony White, Specialist Tractor and Machinery Operator, Crown Estate, Windsor.
- Kenneth Woodley, Senior Bricklayer, Crown Estate, Windsor.

=== Order of the British Empire ===
==== Knights / Dames Commander of the Order of the British Empire (KBE / DBE) ====
Civil Division

- Professor Averil Millicent Cameron, CBE, Professor of Late Antique and Byzantine History, University of Oxford, and Warden, Keble College. For services to Classical Scholarship.
- Sebastian Newbold, Baron Coe, OBE, Chairman, London 2012 Olympic and Paralympic Bid Team. For services to Sport.
- Elizabeth Anne Lucy Forgan, OBE, Chairman, Heritage Lottery Fund. For services to Broadcasting and to Heritage.
- Anna Patricia Lucy Hassan, Headteacher, Millfields Community School, Hackney, London. For services to Education.
- Susan Catherine Leather, MBE, Chairman, Human Fertilisation and Embryology Authority. For services to the Regulation of Infertility Treatment and Embryo Research.
- Julie Thérèse Mellor, Chairman, Equal Opportunities Commission. For services to Equal Opportunities.
- Vivienne Isabel Westwood, OBE, Fashion Designer. For services to British Fashion.

Diplomatic Division

- Dr. Daphne Marjorie Sheldrick, MBE. For services to the conservation of wildlife, especially elephants, and to the local community in Kenya.

==== Commanders of the Order of the British Empire (CBE) ====
Military Division

Navy

- Captain Stephen John Chick, Royal Navy.
- Commodore Peter James Fuller Eberle, Royal Navy.
- Commodore Michael John Potter, ADC, Royal Navy.

Army

- Brigadier Mark St. John Filler (502259), late Adjutant General's Corps (Educational and Training Services Branch).
- Colonel Kathleen George, RRC (507014), late Queen Alexandra's Royal Army Nursing Corps.
- Colonel Richard Justin Kemp, MBE (505991), late The Royal Anglian Regiment.
- Colonel Nigel Christopher Douglas Lithgow (490527), late The Black Watch.
- Colonel Peter Roland Sharland (495581), late The Light Infantry.
- Colonel Barry Arthur Charles Smith, TD (516086), late Royal Army Medical Corps, Territorial Army.

Air Force

- Air Commodore Nicholas Julian Eugene Kurth, OBE, Royal Air Force.
- Group Captain Barry Smith, OBE, Royal Air Force.

Civil Division

- Professor James Louis John Appleby, National Director for Mental Health and Professor of Psychiatry, University of Manchester. For services to Medicine.
- Alistair Grant Arkley, lately chairman, Tees Valley Partnership. For services to Regeneration in the North East.
- David James Purslove Barker, Professor of Clinical Epidemiology, University of Southampton. For services to Preventive Medicine.
- Edna Chivers-Beesley, Senior Civil Servant, Ministry of Defence.
- Rekha Bhakoo, Headteacher, Newton Farm Nursery, First and Middle School, Harrow, London. For services to Education.
- Marcus Hugh Crofton Binney, OBE, Founder and President, SAVE Britain's Heritage. For services to Conservation of the Built Environment.
- Professor Richard William Blundell, Professor of Economics, University College London. For services to Social Science.
- The Honourable Janet Frances Wolfson de Botton. For services to Art.
- Rodney Brack, Chief Executive, Horserace Betting Levy Board. For services to Horseracing.
- Dr. Elizabeth Anne Braidwood, director, Service Personnel Policy, Medical, Ministry of Defence.
- Professor Patricia Broadfoot, Pro-Vice-Chancellor and Professor of Education, University of Bristol. For services to Social Science.
- Dr. Anthony Broady, lately Headteacher, Walker Technology College, Newcastle upon Tyne. For services to Education.
- Elizabeth Young Carmichael, Head of Community Justice Services Division, Scottish Executive.
- Thomas Charles Carne, Chief Advisory Accountant, Solicitor's Office, HM Revenue and Customs.
- Simon Clegg, OBE, Chief Executive, British Olympic Association. For services to Sport.
- Professor Roland Clift, OBE, Professor of Environmental Technology, University of Surrey:; lately Commissioner, Royal Commission on Environmental Pollution. For services to the Environment.
- Alan Ronald Cook, Chief Executive, National Savings and Investments.
- John Robert Cridland, Deputy Director-General, Confederation of British Industry. For services to Business.
- Richard Colin Neil Davidson, lately Vice-President, Dairy UK. For services to the Dairy Industry.
- Julie Dent, Chief Executive, South West London Strategic Health Authority. For services to the NHS and the Health Emergency Services of London.
- Sylvia Ernestine Denton, OBE, President, Royal College of Nursing. For services to Healthcare.
- Alan Doig, QFSM, chief fire officer, Staffordshire Fire and Rescue Service. For services to the Fire and Rescue Service.
- Dr. Derek Jack Douglas. For services to Maggie's Centres Trust in Scotland.
- Laurence Michael Edmans. For services to Pension Reform.
- Anthony Richard Edwards, Head, Buildings and Estates Management, Home Office.
- Professor Alan Hutchinson Fairlamb, Professor of Biochemistry, University of Dundee. For services to Medical Science.
- Michael David Fischer, President, RM plc. For services to Business and to Charity.
- Philip John Fletcher, Director-General, Water Services, Office of Water Services.
- Bruce Joseph Forsyth, OBE, Entertainer and Television Presenter. For services to Entertainment.
- Martin Frank Gale, Vice-President, International Forestry, UPM-Kymmene Corporation. For services to Forestry.
- Peter George Galloway, Headteacher, Trinity Academy, Edinburgh. For services to Education.
- Alexander John Michael Gibson. For services to Food Safety in Scotland.
- Christine Gilbert, Chief Executive, London Borough of Tower Hamlets. For services to Local Government and to Education.
- Christine Joan Goodfellow, director, Payment Modernisation Programme, Department for Work and Pensions.
- John Leonard Grubb, Deputy Director, Transport Security and Contingencies, Department for Transport.
- Anthony William Hall, Chief Executive, Royal Opera House. For services to Opera and to Ballet.
- Hazel Harding, leader, Lancashire County Council. For services to Local Government.
- Professor Robert John Davidge Hazell, director, Constitution Unit. For services to Constitutional Reform.
- David Anthony Hendon, Head, Business Relations, Department of Trade and Industry.
- Peter Gerard Hendy, managing director, Surface Transport, Transport for London. For services to Public Transport and to the community in London.
- David Huw Heycock, lately Head of Serious Organised Crime Agency Implementation, Crown Prosecution Service.
- Lester Blake Hicks, Head of Minerals and Waste Planning Division, Office of the Deputy Prime Minister.
- Colin Hilton, Executive Director, Children's Services, Liverpool City Council. For services to Education.
- Stephen Lewis Hindley, Chairman and Chief Executive, Midas Group. For services to the Construction Industry.
- John Christopher Stephenson Horrocks, Secretary-General, International Chamber of Shipping and International Shipping Federation. For services to the Shipping Industry.
- Robert Ian Howarth, lately Chief Executive, Macmillan City Technology College, Middlesbrough, Cleveland. For services to Education.
- Penelope Joan Humphris, lately Director, NHS Leadership Centre. For services to the NHS.
- Alan John Johnston, managing director, Westland Helicopters Ltd. For services to the Defence and Aviation Industries.
- Rotha Geraldine Diane Johnston. For services to Industry in Northern Ireland.
- Robin Knowles, QC. For services to Pro Bono Legal Services.
- Emma Harriet Lamb, Executive Director, Fairtrade Foundation. For services to Business.
- Michael Werner Lauerman, lately Director, Looked After Children's Taskforce, Department for Education and Skills.
- Professor Vincent Michael Lawton, President, Association of the British Pharmaceutical Industry and managing director of Merck Sharp and Dohme. For services to the Pharmaceutical Industry.
- Arthur Gordon Lishman, OBE, Director-General, Age Concern. For services to Older People.
- Professor Alan George Livingston, DL, Principal, University College Falmouth and chairman, Combined Universities in Cornwall Steering Group. For services to Higher Education.
- Agnes Lawrie Addie Shonaig Macpherson, Chairman, Scottish Council for Development and Industry. For services to Entrepreneurship.
- Professor Robert Edward Mansel, Professor of Surgery, The Wales College of Medicine, Cardiff University. For services to Medicine.
- Marion Jean Matchett, Chief Inspector, Education and Training Inspectorate, Department of Education, Northern Ireland Executive.
- James Oliver McDonald, LVO, MBE, DL, JP. For services to the community in Northern Ireland.
- William Stewart McKee, Chief Executive, Royal Group of Hospitals Trust. For service to the NHS in Northern Ireland.
- Professor Malcolm Donald McLeod, Professor of African Studies, University of Glasgow. For services to Education and to Museums.
- Hugh Salusbury Mellor, Chairman, Berkshire, Buckinghamshire and Oxfordshire Wildlife Trust. For services to Nature Conservation.
- Graeme Stewart Millar, Chairman, Scottish Consumer Council. For services to Consumers in Scotland.
- John Harmsworth Miller. For services to Architecture.
- Alan Ronald Mills, OBE, Wimbledon Tennis Championship Referee. For services to Sport.
- Christine Moffatt, Professor of Nursing, CRICP, Thames Valley University and Nurse Consultant, St. George's Hospital, London. For services to Healthcare.
- Robert Ivor Moss Morrison, lately Assistant Director, Department of the Director of Public Prosecutions for Northern Ireland.
- Dr. Fiona Mary Moss, Postgraduate Dean and Consultant Physician, North West London Hospitals NHS Trust, London. For services to Medicine.
- Mary Katherine Naughton, Chief Nurse, Leeds Teaching Hospitals NHS Trust. For services to the NHS.
- Caroline Ann Palmer, chief executive officer, The Royal Marsden NHS Foundation Trust. For services to the NHS.
- Professor Norman Ernest Palmer, Chairman, Illicit Trade Advisory Panel and Treasure Valuation Committee. For services to Art and to Law.
- Richard William Palmer, OBE, Technical Director. For services to the London 2012 Olympic Bid.
- Brian Walter Pomeroy, Audit Commissioner and lately Chairman of Centrepoint and of Homeless Link. For services to Local Government and to Homeless People.
- John Christopher Savage, Executive chairman, Business West. For services to Business and to Regeneration in the South West.
- Andrew John Scott, Head, National Railway Museum, York. For services to Museums.
- David Scott, lately Deputy Chief Executive and managing director, Channel 4. For services to Broadcasting.
- Beryl Seaman, JP, Chairman, South Yorkshire Probation Board. For services to the National Probation Service.
- David Christopher Sherlock, Chief Inspector and Chief Executive, Adult Learning Inspectorate. For services to Lifelong Learning.
- Cherry Short, Commissioner, Commission for Racial Equality. For services to Equal Opportunities in Wales.
- Peter John Snow, Journalist and Presenter. For services to Broadcasting.
- Graham Stegmann, Director and Strategic Adviser to the Management Board, Department for International Development.
- David Frederick Stevens, QPM., lately Chief Constable, Essex Police. For services to the Police.
- Professor William James Stirling, Pro-Vice-Chancellor, University of Durham. For services to Science.
- The Reverend Dr. John Robert Walmsley Stott. For services to Christian Scholarship and the Christian World.
- David Sutherland, Chairman, The Tulloch Group. For services to Business and to Charity in Scotland.
- Judette Tapper, Headteacher, Stockwell Park High School, Lambeth, London. For services to Education.
- Ila Dianne Thompson, Chief Executive, Camelot Group plc. For services to Business.
- Peter William Gregory Tom. For services to Business and to Sport in Leicestershire.
- Brigadier Ian Glen Townsend, Director-General, Royal British Legion. For services to Ex-service Men and Women.
- Marianne de Trey, Potter. For services to the Arts.
- Douglas John Ward, managing director, Argent Group, Europe. For services to Agriculture in Scotland.
- Philip Stuart Watson, Chief Executive, Blackburn with Darwen Borough Council. For services to Local Government.
- Rachel Whiteread, Sculptor. For services to Art.
- Myles Wickstead, Head of Secretariat, Commission for Africa, Department for International Development.

Diplomatic Division

- Jonathan Paul Ive, Vice-President of Industrial Design, Apple. For services to the design industry.
- Paul Kan Man-Lok. For services to British business interests.
- Ernest George John Montado, OBE, Chief Secretary, Government of Gibraltar.

==== Officers of the Order of the British Empire (OBE) ====
Military Division

Navy

- Surgeon Commander (now Surgeon Commodore) Peter John Buxton, Royal Navy.
- Colonel Edward Grant Martin Davis, MBE, Royal Marines.
- Commodore Duncan Campbell McGregor Fergusson, Royal Navy.
- Commander Pamela Joyce Healy, RD, Royal Naval Reserve.
- Commander Graeme Terence Little, Royal Navy.
- Captain Michael Leigh Davis-Marks, Royal Navy.
- Commander Simon Jonathon Russell, Royal Navy.

Army

- Lieutenant Colonel Kenneth Ian Drake (537766), Corps of Royal Engineers.
- Lieutenant Colonel Anthony Huw Taylor Franks (508838), Intelligence Corps.
- Colonel Julian Richard Free, MBE (524912), late Royal Regiment of Artillery.
- Captain Mark Gaunt (563434), Grenadier Guards.
- Lieutenant Colonel Valerie Heather Hall (511460), Adjutant General's Corps (Educational and Training Support Branch).
- Lieutenant Colonel David Alan Kelly (520747), The Royal Logistic Corps.
- Lieutenant Colonel Colin Philip Graham Martin, Royal Welsh Fusiliers.
- Lieutenant Colonel Stuart John Craig Tootal (527693), The Parachute Regiment.
- Colonel Nicholas Welch, MBE (519611), lately The Royal Gloucestershire, Berkshire and Wiltshire Light Infantry Regiment.
- Lieutenant Colonel Paul Nicholas Willmott, T.D. (518393), Royal Corps of Signals, Territorial Army.

Air Force

- Wing Commander Kevin John Baldwin (8117164F), Royal Air Force.
- Wing Commander Simon John Blake, MBE (8027911K), Royal Air Force.
- Wing Commander David Kai Ming Chan (8027809C), Royal Air Force.
- Wing Commander Stephen Harry Cockram (8028026C), Royal Air Force.
- Wing Commander Adrian Peter Lewis (8087022G), Royal Air Force.
- Wing Commander Richard Charles Read (8024211S), Royal Air Force.
- Group Captain Ian Nicholas Wood (5203307W), Royal Air Force.

Civil Division

- Captain Alan Thomas Roach, Royal Fleet Auxiliary.
- Robert Arthur (Roy) Adams, Executive Director, Laing O'Rourke. For services to Economic Development and Community Relations in North Belfast.
- Nadra Ahmed, Chairman, National Care Homes Association. For services to Social Care.
- Dennis John Alexander, lately Head, Virology Department, Veterinary Laboratories Agency.
- John Douglas Allan, Sheriff, Lothian and Borders. For services to the Administration of Justice.
- Christopher Austin, lately Executive Director, Community Rail Development, Strategic Rail Authority and chairman, West Somerset Railway Company. For services to Passenger Transport.
- The Right Reverend John Austin, lately Bishop of Aston, Birmingham. For services to Inter-faith Relations.
- Tim Austin. For services to Business and to the community in Hampshire.
- Philippa Lucy Foster Back, non-executive director, Defence Management Board and chairman, Defence Audit Committee. For services to the Defence Industry.
- Gillian Elaine Baker, Inspector, West Midlands Police. For services to the Police.
- Jenifer Anne Cooper Baker, lately Head of Volunteering and Community Involvement, National Trust. For services to Heritage.
- Lady Carole Bamford, Vice-Chairman, FULL STOP Campaign, NSPCC and President, Mid-Staffordshire NSPCC Branch. For services to Children and Families.
- John Alfred Barker. For services to the Corporation and City of London.
- Alan John Bates, Chairman, Chatham Historic Dockyards Volunteer Service. For services to Heritage.
- Peter James Samuel Bates, Chairman, NHS Tayside. For services to Social Work and to the NHS in Tayside.
- Frances Mary Beckett, Chief Executive, Church Urban Fund and chairman, Home Office Advisory Group on the Voluntary and Community Sector. For services to Disadvantaged People.
- Ronald Bell, Specialist Inspector, Health and Safety Executive.
- Elinor Bennett, Harpist. For services to Music in Wales.
- Sanjeev Bhaskar, Actor and Writer. For services to Entertainment.
- Manju Bhavani, Consultant Haematologist, Wrightington, Wigan and Leigh NHS Trust. For services to Medicine.
- Roy William Bishop, QFSM, Deputy Commissioner, London Fire and Emergency Planning Authority. For services to the Fire Service and to the people of London.
- Heston Blumenthal, Chef and Restaurant Proprietor. For services to the Hospitality Industry.
- Ozwald Boateng, Tailor. For services to the Clothing Industry.
- Wendy Bourton, Chief Executive, Care and Repair Cymru. For services to the community in Wales.
- Rebecca Margaret Bower, Head of Finance, Royal Botanic Gardens, Kew. For services to Horticulture.
- John Frederick Bowley, lately Director of Corporate Services, Assembly Parliamentary Service, National Assembly for Wales.
- Nicholas Patrick Bracken, Detective Chief Superintendent, British Transport Police. For services to the Police.
- Professor Julia Ruth Briggs, Professor of English and Women's Studies, De Montfort University. For services to Education.
- Professor John Brindley, Governor, York St. John College. For services to Higher Education.
- Tom Brock, Chief Executive, Scottish Seabird Centre. For services to the Tourist Industry.
- Ian Brown, Chairman, Pesticide Residues Committee. For service to Food Safety.
- Margery McLennan Browning, lately Acting HM Chief Inspector of Education, Scottish Executive.
- William Henry Buckley, Director for Operator Licensing, Vehicle and Operator Services Agency.
- Margaret Yvonne Busby. For services to Literature and to Publishing.
- Ken Caldwell, director, International Operations, Save the Children (UK). For services to Children and Families.
- John Kevin Laurence Canavan, lately Resources Director, Resources Directorate, Child Support Agency, Northern Ireland Executive.
- Alfred Carr, Director-General, British Frozen Food Federation. For services to the Food Industry.
- Peter John Carter, Chief Executive, Central and North West London Mental Health NHS Trust. For services to the NHS.
- Professor David Cesarani, Adviser, Holocaust Memorial Day. For services to Holocaust Education.
- Peter John Michael Clarke, CVO, QPM, Deputy Assistant Commissioner, Metropolitan Police Service. For services to the Police.
- Bronwen Cohen, Chief Executive, Children in Scotland. For services to Children and Families in Scotland.
- Robbie Coltrane, Actor. For services to Drama.
- Clare Joanne Connor, MBE, Captain, England Women's Cricket Team. For services to Cricket.
- Sarah Cooke, lately Director, British Institute of Human Rights. For services to Human Rights.
- Griselda Mary Cooper, Consultant Anaesthetist, Birmingham Women's Hospital. For services to Medicine.
- Beryl Dorothy Corner, Senior Fellow, Royal College of Physicians. For services to Paediatric Medicine.
- David Cropper, lately Area Manager, Highways Agency.
- Paul Andrew Cuttill, chief operating officer, EDF Energy plc. For services to the Energy Industry.
- Raymond David Cutting, Engineering Director, Marshall SV. For services to the Defence Industry.
- Professor Angela Dale, Professor of Quantitative Social Research, University of Manchester. For services to Social Science.
- Professor Philip John Dale, Member, Agriculture and Environment Biotechnology Commission. For services to Science.
- Susan Daniels, Chief Executive, National Deaf Children's Society and Disability Rights Commissioner. For services to Children with Special Needs.
- Charles Richard Cameron Dennis. For services to the Staffordshire Pottery Industry.
- Joyce Nora Dobson, leader, Boston Borough Council. For services to Local Government.
- Graeme Dermott Stuart Dunlop, lately President, European Community Shipowners' Associations. For services to the Shipping Industry.
- Lady Ann Christine Eames, Commissioner, Northern Ireland Human Rights Commission. For services to the community in Northern Ireland.
- Victor John East, Revaluation Project Manager, Valuation Office Agency.
- John Richard Martin Edwards, lately chairman, Academy of Food and Wine Service. For services to the Hospitality Industry.
- Horace Arnold Elson. For services to the Poultry Industry.
- Robert Mark Evans. For public service.
- Janet Ann Farenden, Deputy Head of Branch, Private Funding Regulation Branch, Department for Constitutional Affairs.
- Janette Fellows, Assistant Director, Quality Improvement and People Team, HM Revenue and Customs.
- Helen Lesley Fentimen, Chief Executive, South East Sheffield Primary Care Trust. For services to Healthcare.
- Peter Fenwick, Chief Engineering Inspector, Department of Trade and Industry.
- Ian Firth, Head of Planning Casework, Development Department, Scottish Executive.
- Martin Flaherty, Director of Operations, London Ambulance Service NHS Trust. For services to Healthcare.
- Kate Anne Flannery, Inspector, Her Majesty's Inspectorate of Constabulary. For services to the Police.
- Duncan Anthony Gwynne Fletcher, England Cricket Coach. For services to Cricket.
- Colonel George Mason Gadd, Chairman, British Korean Veterans' Association. For services to Ex-Service men and women.
- Daniel William Joseph Galvin. For services to Hairdressing.
- David Garrard, lately Headteacher, Smitham Primary School, Coulsdon, Croydon, Surrey. For services to Education.
- Rebecca George, director, UK Government Business, IBM. For services to the IT Industry.
- Robert Gibson, lately Leader, Stockton Council. For services to Local Government in the North East.
- Roger Graef, Writer and Filmmaker. For services to Broadcasting.
- David Anthony Graveney, Chairman of Selectors, England and Wales Cricket Board. For services to Cricket.
- David Thomas Green, Chief Executive, Liverpool Housing Action Trust. For services to Urban Regeneration.
- Jennifer Griffiths, chairman of the board, Connexions Surrey Partnership Ltd. For services to Young People.
- Peter Albert Griffiths, lately Director of Health Sciences, Lincoln and Louth NHS Trust. For services to Physical Sciences.
- Juris George Grinsbergs, Chairman, National Employment Panel, Liverpool and Sefton Employer Coalition. For services to Welfare to Work.
- Rosalind Gulson, Headteacher, Walton Girls' High School, Grantham, Lincolnshire. For services to Education.
- Professor Neva Elizabeth Haites, Vice-Principal and Head of the College of Life Sciences and Medicine, University of Aberdeen. For services to Medicine.
- Professor Francoise Jane Hampson, Professor of Law, University of Essex. For services to International Law and to Human Rights.
- Alexander John Hannam, Group managing director, Flight Operations and Services, Cobham plc. For services to the Defence Industry.
- Susan Hawkett, Nursing Adviser and Team Leader, Supportive and Palliative Care, Department of Health.
- Robert John Higgs, Chief Executive, Heating and Ventilating Contractors' Association. For services to the Environment.
- Agnes Elizabeth Nan Hill, Consultant Paediatrician, South and East Belfast Health and Social Services Trust. For services to Medicine.
- Alan Charles Hinkes, Mountaineer. For services to Sport.
- Sandra Holtby, lately Head, London College of Fashion, University of the Arts, London. For services to Higher Education.
- William Anthony Horncastle, Chairman, Horncastle Group plc. For services to Business and to Charity in East Riding of Yorkshire.
- Fahmia Huda, Grade 7, National Holocaust Memorial Trust, Home Office.
- David Hughes, Grade B2, Ministry of Defence.
- Graham Alfred Hughes, Land Registrar, HM Land Registry.
- Maureen Hughes, North East Regional Director, Literacy for the National Primary Strategy. For services to Education.
- William Peredur Hughes, Head, National Farmers' Union, Cymru. For services to Agriculture in Wales.
- Margaret Sheila Hyde. For services to the Voluntary Sector.
- Roberta Anne Jacobsen, director, London Health Observatory. For services to Public Health.
- Simon William Geoffrey Jenkin. For services to Education.
- John Peter Jenkins. For services to the Finance Industry.
- Glenys Mary Jones, Chairman, Older People's Committee, Association of Directors of Social Services. For services to Social Care.
- Hefin Jones, General Medical Practitioner and chairman, Welsh Medical Committee. For services to Medicine in South Wales.
- Hefin Jones, Q.F.S.M., chief fire officer, Gloucestershire Fire and Rescue Service. For services to the Fire and Rescue Service.
- David Gerald William Kaye, Print Services Manager, Ordnance Survey.
- Frank Keenan, lately Headteacher, St. Thomas More High School for Boys, Westcliff-on-Sea, Southend, Essex. For services to Education.
- Kenneth William Keir, managing director, Honda (UK) and Senior Vice-President, Honda Motor Europe Ltd. For services to the Automotive Industry.
- Thomas Kelly. For public service.
- Brian Kerr, lately chairman, National Association of Local Councils. For services to Local Government.
- Melvyn Kershaw, Headteacher, Haybridge High School and Sixth Form, Hagley, Worcestershire. For services to Education.
- Leroy Richard Arthur Kettle, Senior Policy Adviser on Disability Rights, Department for Work and Pensions.
- Nazia Khanum, For services to Community Relations and to Equal Opportunities in Luton.
- Professor Kathleen Kiernan, Professor of Social Policy and Demography, University of York. For services to Social Science.
- Trevor John Knight, Executive Head, Library, Heritage and Registration Services, Sutton. For services to Local Government.
- Marc Andrew Koska, director, Star Syringe. For services to Global Healthcare.
- William Harley Lawton, T.D., Chairman of Trustees, Pain Relief Foundation. For services to Health.
- Michael Lee. For services to the London 2012 Olympic Bid.
- Michael Leeke, managing director, J. H. Leeke and Sons Ltd, Llantrisant. For services to the Retail and Leisure Industries and to the community in South Wales.
- Ashley Leiman, Founder and director, Orangutan Foundation UK. For services to the Conservation of Orangutans.
- Elizabeth Jane Lewis, Grade B2, Ministry of Defence.
- Isabella Elizabeth Lind, Headteacher, Ravenscraig Primary School. For services to Education in Inverclyde.
- John Lindsay, Chief Executive, East Lothian Council. For services to Local Government.
- David Philip Linnell, Principal, John Leggott College, Scunthorpe. For services to Further Education.
- Rachel Lipscomb, JP, lately chairman, Magistrates' Association. For services to the Administration of Justice.
- Ian Livingstone, Product Acquisition Director, Eidos Interactive. For services to the Computer Games Industry.
- Professor Adrian Long, lecturer, Queen's University, Belfast. For services to Higher Education and to Engineering.
- Michael Long, HR Reward Specialist, HM Treasury.
- Jurat David Charles Lowe. For services to the Guernsey Royal Court.
- Michael Richard Lynch, Founder and Chief Executive, Autonomy. For services to Enterprise.
- Professor Norbert Casper Lynton, Chairman, Charleston Trust. For services to Art and to Heritage.
- Robert Murdo MacLeod, lately managing director, Highlands and Islands Airports Ltd. For services to the Aviation Industry in the Highlands and Islands.
- Royston Keith Maldoom. For services to Dance.
- Brian Raymond Marker, Principal Scientific Officer, Office of the Deputy Prime Minister.
- Clive Maurice Marks. For charitable services and for services to Christian/Jewish Relations.
- David William Martin, Grade B1, Ministry of Defence.
- Karen Matheson, Singer. For services to Scottish Music.
- Major Muriel McClenahan. For services to the community in London.
- David Robert McCreath, lately Director, Scottish Quality Cereals and board member, Simpsons Malt. For services to the Malting Industry.
- Alastair McInnes, Sales Support Director, MBDA. For services to Export.
- Robin George McInnes, Chairman, Coastal Groups of England and Wales. For services to Flood and to Coastal Protection.
- Evelyn Justina Asante-Mensah, Chairman, Central Manchester Primary Care Trust:; Chief Executive, Black Health Agency & Chairman, Manchester Health Inequalities Partnership. For services to Healthcare.
- Ian George Tweedie Miller, Chairman of Skill Scotland, National Bureau for Students with Disabilities. For services to Education.
- Alexander Moffat, Artist and Head of Painting, Glasgow School of Art. For services to Art.
- Yvonne Laraine Moran Moreno, Crown Prosecutor, Crown Prosecution Service.
- Christopher Moyes, Chief Executive, The Go-Ahead Group plc and chairman, GoSkills, Sector Skills Council for Passenger Transport. For services to Passenger Transport.
- Thomas Wilfred Mulryne, lately Principal, Methodist College, Belfast. For services to Education.
- Philip Anthony Neale, Tour Manager, England and Wales Cricket Board. For services to Cricket.
- The Very Reverend Kenneth Norman Ernest Newell, lately Moderator of the Presbyterian Church in Ireland. For services to Community Relations in Northern Ireland.
- Barry Nicholls, Grade 6, The Pension Service.
- Jeremy Nichols, D.L. For services to the Sea Cadet Corps in Scotland and North East England.
- Alan Richard Norman. For services to Telecommunications.
- Hilary Elizabeth Omissi, Deputy Director for Children and Learners, Government Office for the South East.
- Professor Upkar Singh Pardesi, Dean of Business School, University of Central England. For services to Higher Education.
- Christopher Wallace Passmore, Farmer. For services to Nature Conservation and to Agriculture.
- Maganbhai Paragbhai Patel, President, Gujarat Hindu Association. For services to Community Relations in Leicestershire.
- Professor Patricia Ida Peattie, lately Assistant Principal, Napier University. For services to Education and to Health in Scotland.
- Paul Louis Pedley, Executive Deputy chairman, Redrow plc. For services to Business in Wales.
- Alan Francis Pegler, President, Ffestiniog Railway. For services to Railway Heritage.
- Robin Anthony Pellew, Chief Executive, National Trust for Scotland. For services to Conservation.
- Brian Anthony Peters, JP, Chairman, Peters plc. For services to Business and to the community in Chichester, West Sussex.
- Katerina Frances Phillips, director, External Relations, Christian Aid. For services to Disadvantaged People.
- Marta Rose Phillips, Chairman, Servite Houses. For services to Social Housing.
- John Player, Headteacher, Grange Technology College, Bradford, West Yorkshire. For services to Education.
- Ronald Gardner Porter, managing director, Charles Tennant and Co (Northern Ireland) Ltd. For services to the Roads Industry in Northern Ireland.
- Dai Powell, Chief Executive, Hackney Community Transport. For services to disabled people.
- Michael John Power, lately chief operating officer, London 2012 Ltd. For services to Sport.
- Rhiannedd Pratley, lately Executive-Director Wales, Basic Skills Agency. For services to Education in Wales.
- Kieran Thomas Preston, Clerk, West Yorkshire Passenger Transport Authority. For services to Public Transport.
- Helen Marcia Puckey, lately Headteacher, Hempshill Hall Primary School, Bulwell, Nottingham. For services to Education.
- Reginald George Purnell, Chief Engineer, Department for Environment, Food and Rural Affairs.
- Shelagh Rae, lately Director, Education and Leisure Services, Renfrewshire Council. For services to Education.
- Susan Elizabeth Wilson Raikes, Chief Executive, Thames Valley Partnership. For services to Community Safety.
- Gordon James Ramsay, Chef and Restaurant Proprietor. For services to the Hospitality Industry.
- John Nellies Ramsay, lately Chief Executive, COGENT. For services to Training and Lifelong Learning in Scotland.
- Catharina Reynolds, Grade A, Olympic Games Unit, Department for Culture, Media and Sport.
- Professor Greta Ann Richards, Panel Assessor, Civil Service Selection Board. For public service.
- Professor Peter Thomas Ricketts, Honorary Professor, University of Birmingham. For services to Medieval Languages and Literature.
- Ann Robinson, Principal, Woodhouse College, Barnet, London. For services to Further Education.
- Nicholas Robinson, Head of Policy and Ministerial Support, UK Trade and Investment.
- Cheryl Rolph, Director of People and Performance, Cambridgeshire Fire and Rescue Service. For services to the Fire and Rescue Services.
- Malcolm Roughead, Marketing Director, VisitScotland. For services to the Tourist Industry.
- Professor Edmund Charles Penning-Rowsell. For services to Flood Risk Management.
- Michael Ruddock. For services to Welsh Rugby.
- Professor Anthony John Ryan, ICI Professor of Physical Chemistry, University of Sheffield. For services to Science.
- Margaret Scanlan, Member, Scottish Legal Aid Board. For services to the Administration of Justice in Scotland.
- David Scholes. For services to the Communications Industry.
- Elizabeth Ann Marie Scott, B1, Ministry of Defence.
- Professor Andrew Self, Pro Vice-Chancellor (Enterprise), Kingston University. For services to Higher Education.
- Debbie Sell, Head of Speech and Language Therapy, Great Ormond Street Hospital for Children NHS Trust. For services to the NHS.
- Norman Sharp, Director of Quality Assurance Agency for Higher Education, Scotland Office. For services to Higher Education.
- Anne Jane Shevas, lately chief press officer, Prime Minister's Office.
- Professor Ian Alexander Charles Sinclair, Research Professor, Social Work Research and Development Unit, University of York.
- John Pashawar Singh, Member, School Teachers' Review Body. For services to Education.
- Sister Isabel Smyth, lately Chief Executive, Scottish Inter-faith Council. For services to Inter-faith Relations.
- Imelda Mary Philomena Bernadette Staunton, Actress. For services to Drama.
- Penelope Streeter, Co-Founder and managing director, Ambition 24hours. For services to Women's Enterprise and to Business.
- Lesley Stubbings, Council Member, Sheep Veterinary Society. For services to the Livestock Industry.
- John Summers, lately Chief Executive, Keep Scotland Beautiful. For services to the Environment.
- Alan Sykes, lately Her Majesty's Inspector and Assistant Divisional Manager, Research Analysis and International Division, Office for Standards in Education.
- James Bradley Taylor, Chief Executive, Northern Lighthouse Board. For services to the Maritime Industry.
- Helen Margaret Taylor-Thompson, MBE. For services to Health and Welfare in the UK and Africa.
- Keith Thomson, lately Chief Executive, North West Wales NHS Trust. For services to the NHS in Wales.
- John Thorley, Chief Executive, National Sheep Association. For services to Sheep Farming.
- The Most Venerable Medagama Vagiragnana, Head, London Buddhist Vihara. For services to Inter-faith Relations.
- Michael Paul Vaughan, England Cricket Captain. For services to Cricket.
- Meredith Vivian, Head of Patient Public Involvement, Department of Health.
- David Francis Walker, Chairman, British Potato Council. For services to Agriculture.
- Professor Alan George Waller, Visiting Professor, International Supply Chain Management, Cranfield University and President, Chartered Institute of Logistics and Transport. For services to Logistics.
- Graham John Walters. For services to Business and to the community in South Wales.
- Unni Krishna Kundukalangara Wariyar, Consultant Neonatal Paediatrician, Royal Victoria Infirmary, Newcastle upon Tyne. For services to Medicine.
- Lady Suzanne Elizabeth Warner. For services to Plant Conservation.
- Clive Warren, lately Head of Overseas Territories Department, Department for International Development.
- Owen Watkin, Chief Executive, Ceredigion County Council. For services to Local Government in Wales.
- Michael John Wear, Chairman, Vehicle Crime Reduction Action Team. For public service.
- Jeffrey James West, lately Policy Director, English Heritage. For services to the Historic Environment.
- Peter Robert White, lately Secretary, Royal Commission on the Ancient and Historical Monuments of Wales. For services to Heritage.
- Stephen Whittle, lately Controller, Editorial Policy, BBC. For services to Broadcasting.
- Alastair Walter Wilson, consultant, Accident and Emergency, Royal London Hospital. For services to Medicine.
- Kim Winser, Chief Executive, Pringle of Scotland. For services to the Textiles Industry.
- Jeanette Winterson, Writer. For services to Literature.
- Sally Anne Witcher, Chairman, Disability Employment Advisory Committee. For services to disabled people.
- Lady Kathleen Audrey Wood. For services to Conservation in Oxfordshire.
- Professor Ashley Woodcock, Professor of Respiratory Medicine, University of Manchester. For services to the Montreal Protocol.
- Clive Alan Woolf, Solicitor. For services to the Privy Council.
- Peter John Workman. For services to the International Festival of the Sea.
- Christopher John Wright, lately Head, Western Manuscripts, British Library. For services to Scholarship.
- John Mitchel Wylie, Chief Executive, Ulster Supported Employment Limited. For services to disabled people.
- Graham Wynn, director, TTC 2000. For services to Road Safety.
- Alan Yau, Restaurateur. For services to the Hospitality Industry.
- Hosney Mohammed Ahmed Ali Yosef, Senior Consultant Clinical Oncologist. For services to Medicine in the West of Scotland.
- Rosemary Sarah Machen-Young, director, My Hotels (Nairn) Ltd. For services to Welfare to Work and to the Hospitality Industry in the Highlands.
- Patrick Chung Yin-yu, Executive Director, Northern Ireland Council for Ethnic Minorities. For services to Community Relations.
- Christopher Yule, lately Chief Crown Prosecutor, Suffolk, Crown Prosecution Service.
- Michael Norman Zarraga, lately Headteacher, St. Thomas More School, Gateshead, Tyne and Wear. For services to Education.
- Professor Timothy David van Zwanenberg, professor, Postgraduate General Practice and director, Postgraduate General Practice Education, University of Newcastle upon Tyne. For services to Healthcare.

Diplomatic Division

- William Richard Charles Beeston. For services to journalism.
- Michael Gabriel Brophy. For services to education in developing countries.
- Petronella Leonie Diana Byrde, lately First Secretary, Foreign and Commonwealth Office.
- Ann Lesley Cotton, Founder of CAMFED. For services to education for girls in Africa.
- Ailsa Rosemary May Domanova. For services to Second World War veterans and widows in the Slovak Republic and to UK-Slovak relations.
- Professor Michael Edwards. For services to literature and UK-French cultural relations.
- Tim Gurney, lately Deputy Head of Mission, British Embassy, Kabul.
- Robert Henry Owen Hayward. For humanitarian services overseas, especially through Christian Aid.
- Dora Claire Sarah (Sally) Healy, lately Senior Principal Research Officer, Foreign and Commonwealth Office.
- Paul Douglas Hillier. For services to choral music overseas.
- The Honourable Thomas Robert Benedict Hurd, First Secretary, Foreign and Commonwealth Office.
- Anne James. Executive Director, International Justice Project. For services to human rights overseas.
- Andrew Jamieson. For services to British business interests and to sustainable development in Nigeria.
- Christopher Avedis Keljik. For services to British business interests and to local communities in Africa and South Asia.
- William Lucas Lindesay. For services to UK/China understanding and to international conservation of the Great Wall.
- Edward David Gerard Llewellyn, MBE, lately Head of Political Department, Office of the High Representative for Bosnia and Herzegovina.
- Gareth Geoffrey Lungley, First Secretary, Foreign and Commonwealth Office.
- Stella Margaret Marsden. For services to wildlife conservation and to the local community in The Gambia.
- Lindsey McAlister, MBE. For services to UK arts in Hong Kong.
- Geoffrey Watson Moore. For services to the arts in Bermuda.
- Peter David Nardini, Technical Director, Dresden Trust. For services to UK-German relations.
- Susan Olde. For charitable services, Cayman Islands.
- Roderic Ethelbert Pearman, JP. For services to the community, Cayman Islands.
- Andrew John Fairlie Picken, lately Deputy Director, British Council, Pakistan.
- Albert Andrew Poggio, MBE, Director of Gibraltar Office, London.
- Michael Alfred Potter, Project Manager for China, GAP Activity Projects. For services to UK-Chinese relations.
- Christine Winifred Preston. For services to healthcare and development in Bangladesh and Nepal.
- Andrew Barnett Richards. For ophthalmic services to disadvantaged people in South Asia and Africa.
- Michael Ronald Rutland. For services to UK-Bhutanese relations.
- Dominic Timothy Charles Scriven. For services to UK financial services in Vietnam.
- Graham Frank Sim. For services to the community, St. Helena.
- Philip Andrew Sinkinson, lately Deputy High Commissioner, Kingston.
- Robert Thain, First Secretary, Foreign and Commonwealth Office.
- Richard Charles Uren. For services to British business interests in France.
- Derek Arthur John Warby, MBE, Resource Director, Kofi Annan International Peacekeeping Centre, Accra.
- Richard Gareth Williams, lately Director, Mostar Implementation Unit, Office of the High Representative for Bosnia and Herzegovina.
- Simon Winchester. For services to journalism and literature.

==== Members of the Order of the British Empire (MBE) ====
Military Division

Navy

- Warrant Officer 1st Class (Writer) William Armour D144940J.
- Warrant Officer 1st Class (Catering Services) John Walter Brett D135686U.
- Local Acting chief petty officer(Diver) Robert John Daniels D170865Q.
- Local Acting Band Colour Sergeant Ian Davies, Royal Marines P037074A.
- Warrant Officer 1st Class (Marine Engineering Artificer) Robert Alan Edward Giddings D130594N.
- Major Jeremy Peter Hermer, Royal Marines.
- Lieutenant Commander Finn Adam Egeland-Jensen, Royal Navy.
- Lieutenant Commander Craig Antony Jones, Royal Navy.
- Leading Operator Mechanic (Survey Recorder) Christopher Thomas Jordan D242799N.
- Warrant Officer 1st Class (Weapon Engineering Artificer) Colin Richard Ling D156631M.
- Lieutenant Commander Karl Fraser Mardon, Royal Navy.
- Commander Karen McTear, Royal Navy.
- chief petty officer(Diver) Andrew John Moss D161671E.
- Warrant Officer 1st Class (Stores Accountant) Christopher Nicholas Mountford D169662K.
- Lieutenant Commander Alexandra Sard, RD, Royal Naval Reserve.
- chief petty officerMedical Assistant Kevin Shore D177102U.

Army

- Major James Bryan Balls (523313), The Cheshire Regiment.
- Major Philip Hedley Barber (533037), The Royal Logistic Corps.
- Sergeant David John Beattie, 24289565, The Royal Irish Regiment.
- Sergeant Paul Brewer, 24623176, Royal Tank Regiment.
- Major Stephen Barry Cannon (547217), Corps of Royal Electrical and Mechanical Engineers.
- Captain Richard James Carney (554247), The Blues and Royals.
- Warrant Officer Class 2 James Douglas Condy, 24201350, Royal Regiment of Artillery.
- Captain Dennis Reginald Crook (516681), The West Midlands Regiment, Territorial Army.
- Warrant Officer Class 2 Paul Daniels, 24847743, The Royal Welsh Regiment, Territorial Army.
- Staff Sergeant Alastair John Farrow, 24879000, Adjutant General's Corps (Staff and Personnel Support Branch).
- Major Richard Anthony Gates (480302), 1st The Queen's Dragoon Guards.
- Captain Sally Frances Glazebrook (550395), General List, Territorial Army.
- Lieutenant Colonel Simon Robert Goldstein (522684), General List, Territorial Army.
- Major Dominic Stuart Hargreaves (518116), Corps of Royal Engineers.
- Captain John Harrower (563355), Adjutant General's Corps (Staff and Personnel Support Branch).
- Major Peter Edwin Duncan Hicks, JP (495526), Coldstream Guards.
- Acting Lieutenant Colonel David Currie Johnstone (518759), West Lowland Battalion Army Cadet Force.
- Major Hugh Layton Kennedy (531770), The Light Infantry.
- Acting Major James Kerrigan (509959), Glasgow and Lanarkshire Battalion Army Cadet Force.
- Major Andrew Richard Knott (532660), Royal Corps of Signals.
- Warrant Officer Class 1 John Lazenby, 24694659, Adjutant General's Corps (Staff and Personnel Support Branch).
- Major Paul Stuart Leslie (533634), The Royal Anglian Regiment.
- Captain Steven MacLaren (563446), Royal Corps of Signals.
- Major David Alexander Grevile Madden (525610), The Queen's Royal Hussars.
- Major Michael Paul Manning (540203), Army Air Corps.
- Corporal Patrick Dean McGeever, 24873964, Corps of Royal Electrical and Mechanical Engineers.
- Major Alan William Needle (542471), The Queen's Royal Lancers.
- Lance Corporal Neil James Perkins, 25062597, Royal Corps of Signals.
- Warrant Officer Class 1 Brian Pratt, 24438976, The Parachute Regiment, Territorial Army.
- Major Jeffrey Robinson (534280), Adjutant General's Corps (Staff and Personnel Support Branch), Territorial Army.
- Lieutenant Colonel Ian Christopher Rogers (525523), Corps of Royal Electrical and Mechanical Engineers.
- Captain Keith Edward Rumbold (563741), Corps of Royal Engineers.
- Warrant Officer Class 2 Andrew Stanley Rutt, 24795665, Adjutant General's Corps (Staff and Personnel Support Branch).
- Sergeant Paul James Shephard, 24808316, Adjutant General's Corps (Royal Military Police).
- Captain Norman Leslie Siggs (545024), Royal Corps of Signals, Territorial Army.
- Captain Michael Albert Solomons (557763), Royal Corps of Signals.
- Lieutenant Colonel Sarah Louise Streete, T.D. (543399), Royal Corps of Signals, Territorial Army.
- Major Gerald Mark Strickland (533572), The Royal Gurkha Rifles.
- Major Philip Edward Stuart (545683), Royal Regiment of Artillery.
- Captain Eric John Tarr (533515), The Royal Logistic Corps, Territorial Army.
- Staff Sergeant Eric Taylor, 24277359, The King's and Cheshire Regiment, Territorial Army.
- Major Mark Richard Thomas (553601), Corps of Royal Engineers.
- Acting Lieutenant Colonel Richard Gallacher Turner (541741), The Edinburgh Academy Combined Cadet Force.
- Major Nicholas Craig Wharmby (529591), Army Air Corps.
- Major Martyn Russel Wills (528749), The Parachute Regiment.
- Major David Wilson (525669), Corps of Royal Engineers.

Air Force

- Flight Lieutenant Darrell Caery Eric Adrian Anderson (2628612F), Royal Air Force.
- Squadron Leader Nicola Elizabeth Bell (0009760G), Royal Air Force.
- Warrant Officer Christopher Alexander Roy Blackman (S8118196), Royal Air Force.
- Flight Sergeant Edward Joseph Brophy (P8112028), Royal Air Force.
- Flight Sergeant Stephen David Butterworth (C8138984), Royal Air Force.
- Squadron Leader John Winston Clarke (8210956H), Royal Air Force.
- Warrant Officer John Duff (T8072883), Royal Air Force.
- Squadron Leader Paul Evans (5206641F), Royal Air Force.
- Flight Lieutenant John Andrew Reid Franklin (8154684K), Royal Air Force.
- Wing Commander Michael Stafford Humphreys (5206791D), Royal Air Force.
- Warrant Officer Michael John Edwin Jones (P8089898), Royal Air Force.
- Wing Commander Paul John David Lenihan (5205182K), Royal Air Force.
- Warrant Officer Andrew David Mallett (Q8007580), Royal Air Force.
- Squadron Leader Peter James Scantlebury (5207280U), Royal Air Force.
- Sergeant Graeme Snowdon (E8289175), Royal Air Force.
- Warrant Officer David Alan Starkings (E8084434), Royal Air Force.
- Squadron Leader John Arthur Turner (8023812P), Royal Air Force.
- Master Aircrew Ronald Webb (D8140859), Royal Air Force.

Civil Division

- Captain Paul Whyte, Royal Fleet Auxiliary.
- Robert Peter Ackroyd, Director-General, National Wood Textile Export Corporation. For services to the Textile Industry.
- John Adams, Head, Correspondence and Enquiry Unit, HM Treasury.
- Valerie Lawson Adamson. For services to the community in Oxted, Surrey.
- Roger James Adshead, Chief Executive Director, Framlingham Farmers Ltd. For services to Agriculture.
- Aosaf Afzal, Science Communication Manager, Royal Society. For services to Science.
- Dr. Hussain Ahmed, Training Adviser, Halton College, Warrington, Cheshire. For services to Further Education in the UK and Overseas.
- Edna May Ainge. For services to disabled people in the Isle of Man.
- Patrick Kenneth Aird, Secretary, Scottish Raptor Study Groups. For services to Wildlife Conservation.
- Francis Royston Allen, Chairman, Llanelli Disabled Access Group. For services to disabled people in South Wales.
- John Allen. For services to the community in Wednesbury, West Midlands.
- Christopher John Allison, Commander, Metropolitan Police Service. For services to the Police.
- Leslie Henry Ames, Member, Weymouth Borough Council. For services to the community in Dorset.
- Maureen Elizabeth Anderson, Assistant Assurance Officer, HM Revenue and Customs.
- Dr. Khalid Anis, Assistant Head of Salaried Dental Services, Rochdale Primary Care Trust, Rochdale NHS Dental Access Centre. For services to Dentistry.
- Elizabeth Joan Anson, JP. For services to the community in Salisbury, Wiltshire.
- Dr. Antoine, Principal, TCS Tutorial College, Brent, London. For services to Adult Learning and to Community Development.
- Dallas Ariotti, Director of Organisational Transformation, Guy's and St. Thomas' NHS Foundation Trust. For services to Healthcare.
- Frank Armer. For services to the community in Barrow-in-Furness, Cumbria.
- Jonathan Mark Armstrong. For services to the London 2012 Olympic Bid.
- Alfred Austin. For services to the community in Dudley, West Midlands.
- Robina Bailey. For services to the Soldiers', Sailors' and Airmen's Families Association in Worcestershire.
- Kathy Baker, Range 8 Executive, Strategy and Communications Group Board Secretariat, Department of Trade and Industry.
- Pauline Baker, Practice Nurse. For services to Healthcare.
- Paul Bamford, Higher Investigation Officer, Law Enforcement, Investigation (Drugs), HM Revenue and Customs.
- Robert Barber, Head of Expressive Arts, The Park Community School, Barnstaple, Devon. For services to Education.
- Marie Catherine Bardrick, lately Usher, Royal Courts of Justice, Department for Constitutional Affairs.
- Anthony Michael Barnes. For services to the community in Cambridge.
- Keith John Barnes, Senior Management Technician, Department of Pharmaceutics, School of Pharmacy, University of London. For services to Higher Education.
- Brian Barnett. For services to Young People in Troedyrhiw, Merthyr Tydfil.
- Roy Barraclough, Actor. For services to Drama and to Charity in the North West.
- Gillian Barratt, Railway Inspectorate Contacts Officer, HM Railway Inspectorate, Health and Safety Executive.
- Van Roy Heflin Barrett, Programme Manager, Alternative Skills for Life, Stoke-on-Trent College. For services to Further Education and to Young People.
- Anne-Marie Batt, Mrs, Administrative Officer, Child Support Agency.
- Roy Beazley, board member, Community Chest Small Grants. For services to the community in Southampton.
- Agnes Beers, Administrative Assistant, Personnel Division, Department for Regional Development, Northern Ireland Executive.
- Sarah Elizabeth Beeson, Health Visitor. For services to the community in Stafford.
- Ian Ronald Bell. For services to Cricket.
- Genevieve Margaret Belton. For public service.
- Richard Oliver Bennett, Chairman, Bedfordshire and River Ivel Internal Drainage Board. For services to Flood Defence.
- Diana Jill Berliand, JP. For services to the Independent Monitoring Board, HM Prison High Down, Surrey and to the Independent Monitoring Boards National Advisory Council.
- Diane Berry, Director of Music, Graveney School, Tooting, Wandsworth, London. For services to Education.
- Babette Beverley, Singer. For services to Music.
- Joy Beverley, Singer. For services to Music.
- Teddie Beverley, Singer. For services to Music.
- Snober Sultana Bhangu, Founder and chairman, Midlands Alnisa Association. For services to Community Relations in Birmingham.
- Maureen Bidwell. For services to the Soldiers', Sailors' and Airmen's Families Association in Hampshire.
- Alison Carol Bilsland. For services to community in Arran, Isle of Arran.
- Peter Noel Bird, Governor, Dearne Valley College, South Yorkshire. For services to Further Education.
- Edith Blake, lately chairman, Highland Children's Panel. For services to the Children's Hearings System in Scotland.
- Mary Herdman Boardman, Secretary, Denny and Dunipace Citizens' Advice Bureau. For services to the community in the area of Denny and Dunipace.
- Brenda Margaret Bolton. For services to Ecclesiastical History.
- Marjory Bond. For services to the community in Rochdale, Lancashire.
- Mary Elizabeth Bott. For services to the community in Aberporth, Ceredigion.
- Jagmohan Bouri, lately Revenue Officer, HM Revenue and Customs.
- George Bowers, Vice-President, Schools Amateur Boxing Association. For services to Sport.
- William Henry Bowker, JP. For services to the Administration of Justice in Blackburn.
- David Richard Donald Boyce. Station Supervisor, London Underground. For services to Public Transport in London.
- James Boyle, DFC. For services to the Royal Air Forces Association in Fife.
- John Michael Boyle, Train Operator, London Underground. For services to Public Transport in London.
- John Bradbury. For services to the community in Kniveton, Derbyshire.
- John Stuart Bradbury, Auxiliary Coastguard, Knott End Coastguard Rescue Team. For services to Maritime Safety.
- David Henry Bradnock, DL, JP. For services to the Administration of Justice and to the community in the West Midlands.
- Julie Anne Mary Bradshaw. For services to Swimming and to Charity.
- Barbara Eudene Brewster, JP, Health Promotion and Education Officer, Sickle Cell Society. For services to Healthcare.
- Myra Briggs, Social Worker, National Secure Women's Services, Rampton Hospital, Retford, Nottinghamshire. For services to Healthcare.
- David Broderick, Clerk, Llay Community Council. For services to the community in Llay, Wrexham.
- George Brooker. For services to the community in Slough, Berkshire.
- Brian Raymond Broughton. For charitable services in Tamworth, Staffordshire.
- Graham Brown, Grade C1, Ministry of Defence.
- John Robert Brown, Executive Director, University for Industry. For services to Lifelong Learning and e-Learning.
- Elizabeth Brownlie. For services to the community in Bothwell, Lanarkshire.
- Noel Brownsell, Foster Carer, London Borough of Croydon. For services to Children and Families.
- David Christopher Bryant. For services to the Smethwick Heritage Centre and to the community in West Midlands.
- Frederick Alfred Bullions, Senior Technical Officer, Hampshire County Council's Trading Standards Service. For services to Consumers.
- William Burdett, Council Member, Poultry Club of Great Britain. For services to the Poultry Industry.
- Anne Burge, Neurophysiology Healthcare Scientist, City Hospital, Birmingham. For services to Physiological Sciences.
- Michael Anthony Burnage. For charitable services in Brighton, East Sussex.
- Bessie Burns, Councillor, Anglesey County Council. For services to the community in Anglesey.
- Charles Powys Butler, Chairman, College of Pharmacy Practice. For services to the NHS.
- Margaret Baker Butler. For services to Tourism in Cardiff and in Wales.
- Nicholas Philip Cabot. For services to Choral Music in Jersey.
- Charles Stanley Caisey. For services to Fishmongering.
- Peter Cameron, Regional Works Manager, Historic Scotland, Scottish Executive.
- Adela Cathleen Carlisle. For services to the community in Northern Ireland.
- Dorothy Cartwright, Supervising Usher, Chester Crown Court, Department for Constitutional Affairs.
- Kenneth Caslaw. For services to the Sea Cadet Corps in Whitley Bay.
- John Cassidy, Programme Co-ordinator, Cardonald College. For services to Further Education in Scotland.
- Heather Chapman, Neighbourhood Watch Volunteer. For services to the community in West Yorkshire.
- Peter John Chapman. For services to the Civil Service Sports Council.
- Jenny Charlesworth, Community Centre Manager. For services to the Coxmoor Estate, Kirkby-in-Ashfield, Nottinghamshire.
- William Alan Charlton. For services to the community in Darlington.
- Winifred June Chase. For services to the Three Choirs Festival and to the community in Hereford.
- Margaret Elizabeth Chilton. For services to Townwomen's Guilds.
- William Chisholm, lately Journalist. For services to the Newspaper Industry.
- Lynn Clare, Chief Executive, Parents Against Drug Abuse. For services to Families of People who Misuse Drugs.
- Patricia Ann Clark, Administrative Officer, Leeds Employment Tribunal Office, Department of Trade and Industry.
- The Reverend Canon Elizabeth Jane Clay, Prison Chaplain, HM Prison and Young Offenders' Institution, New Hall, West Yorkshire.
- Dennis Ernest Cockbaine, Chairman, Bristol and District Retirement Council. For services to Older People and to the community in Bristol.
- Annie Millar Coleman. For services to Environment Justice and to the community in Greengairs, North Lanarkshire.
- Barbara Anne Collier, lately Director of Nursing and Patient Services, Slough Primary Care Trust. For services to Healthcare.
- Paul David Collingwood. For services to Cricket.
- Patricia Carole Comer. For services to St. John Ambulance Brigade in Somerset.
- Kay Barbara Comfort, Grade C1, Ministry of Defence.
- Lorna Maureen Coulson, Advanced Skills Teacher for Science, Langley Park School for Girls, Bromley, London. For services to Education.
- Marjorie Coulthard, Physiotherapist. For services to Healthcare.
- Dr. Eileen Mary Court lately Deputy Headteacher, Rising Brook High School, Stafford. For services to Education.
- Richard George Cowan, Head of Technology, Grosvenor Grammar School, Belfast. For services to Education.
- Stephen John Cowdry, Vehicle Electrician, Ministry of Defence.
- Nicholas Ievers Cox, Arctic Base Commander. For services to British Polar Science.
- Elaine Barbara Lillian Craven, managing director, Earl Street Employment Consultants Ltd. For services to Business and to the community in Kent.
- Captain Thomas Crookall, Chairman, Merchant Navy Welfare Board. For services to the Welfare of British Seamen.
- Brian Geoffrey Currie. For services to Trade Aid in Africa and to the community in Fordingbridge, Hampshire.
- Brian Peter Curtis. For services to Cycling in Scotland.
- Ivan Da Costa, lately Cleaner, MacLellan's Facilities Management. For services to the Ministry of Defence.
- David Albiston Daniel. For services to the community in Congleton, Cheshire.
- Patricia Mary Daniel. For services to the Royal British Legion in Newton Abbot, Devon.
- Elizabeth Mary Danks, JP. For services to the community in North Berwick, East Lothian.
- Phyllis June Darbyshire, Chairman, Capel Parish Council. For services to the community in Tunbridge Wells, Kent.
- Councillor Katia David, JP. For services to Anglo/Greek Relations and to the community in London.
- Thomas John David. For services to the community in Porthcawl, South Wales.
- Evan David Davies. For charitable services to the NHS in South West Wales.
- Ivy Davis, Volunteer Helper, Chad Vale Primary School, Birmingham. For services to Education.
- Neil Robert Daws. For charitable services.
- Marjorie Deane, Economic Journalist and Founder, Marjorie Deane Financial Journalism Foundation. For services to the Finance Industry.
- Alan Dell, Network Liaison Manager, London Buses. For services to the Bus Industry.
- Marina Dennis. For services to Crofting in Strathspey.
- Christopher Alban Deverill, Trustee, Fire Service National Benevolent Fund. For services to the Fire and Rescue Service.
- Iain Alexander Dickson. For services to the Scottish Association of Prostate Cancer Support Groups and to Scotland's Cancer Strategy.
- Robert Henry Wilson Diver. For services to Oxfam, Great Britain.
- Barbara Dixon, Administrative Officer, Field Operations Directorate, Health and Safety Executive.
- George Doherty (Great Britain), Tug Captain, Londonderry Port and Harbour Commissioners. For services to the Ports Industry.
- Neil Doig, Constable, Lothian and Borders Police. For services to the Police.
- John Alexander Campbell Don, D.L., JP, lately Member, Farm Animal Welfare Council. For services to Farming.
- William Donaghy, managing director, Huco Lightronic (NI) Ltd. For services to Business in Northern Ireland.
- Denis Doogan. For services to Medical Research.
- Agnes (Rita) Margaret Douglas. For charitable services in County Down, Northern Ireland.
- Raymond Howard Dowsett. For services to the Royal British Legion in Kings Lynn, Norfolk.
- Gerald Thomas Drewett. For services to the community in Newport, South Wales.
- Marie Drover, Sister. For services to Nursing in the Scottish Borders.
- Martyn Ernest Duffield, Trustee, Lineham Farm Children's Centre. For services to the community in West Yorkshire.
- Patrick Duffy, Court Crier, County Court Judges, Department for Constitutional Affairs.
- Gilbert Egerton Dyson, Secretary, Helsby Golf Club Powered WheelChairman Appeal. For services to Young People in Cheshire.
- Norman Ralph Eastbrook. For services to Music and to the community in Essex.
- Allen Eaton. For services to the Hollowell Steam and Heavy Horse Show and to the community in Hollowell, Northamptonshire.
- Frank Ella. For services to the community in Goole, East Riding of Yorkshire.
- Ellen Maud Emms. For services to the community in Coventry.
- David Anthony James Endacott, Chairman, Oxfordshire Bat Group. For services to the Conservation of Bats.
- Yvonne Evans. For services to the League of Friends at Maidstone Hospital and to the community in Hollingbourne, Kent.
- Margaret Mary Eyre, President, East Gloucestershire Hockey Club. 'For services to Sport.
- Tunji Fahm. For services to Community Relations in Wales.
- Colin John Fallaize. For services to the community in Guernsey.
- Hugh Aidan Faloona, lately District Manager, Translink. For services to Public Transport in Northern Ireland.
- Robert Farrow, Manager, Belle Vue Centre. For services to the community in Hartlepool.
- Deborah Anne Lynne Fenwick, Constable, British Transport Police. For services to the community in London.
- Wilma Finlay, Company Director, Cream o'Galloway Dairy Company. For services to the Tourist Industry in Scotland.
- Maureen Flaherty, Higher Executive Officer, Disability and Carers Service, Department for Work and Pensions.
- Audrey Flash, lately Youth Worker, Woodview, Birmingham. For services to Young People in Birmingham.
- Andrew Flintoff, England and Lancashire Cricketer. For services to Cricket.
- Professor Thomas Grant Fraser, Chairman, Northern Ireland Museums Council. For services to Museums.
- Selwyn Henry Gibson. For services to the community in Newcastle-under-Lyme, Staffordshire.
- Peggy Mary Gidley. For services to the Royal British Legion in Oundle, Northamptonshire.
- Ashley Fraser Giles. For services to Cricket.
- Carol Gledhill, Officer, HM Prison and Young Offenders' Institution New Hall, West Yorkshire.
- Thomas Vincent Goane, lately general manager, Arriva London. For services to the Bus Industry.
- Gary Goose, Detective Chief Inspector, Cambridgeshire Constabulary. For services to the Police.
- Dawn Goring, Team Secretary, Communications Team, HM Treasury.
- The Reverend Bryan John Gracie, Chaplain, HM Prison Birmingham.
- George Currie Graham, Chairman, Parkhead Citizens' Advice Bureau Management Committee. For services to the community in Glasgow.
- Philippa Grant, lately board member, NHS Quality Improvement Scotland. For services to the NHS in Scotland.
- Sheena Grant, Cleaner and chairman, Unison, University of Aberdeen. For services to Education.
- Barbara Ann Green, Safety, Health and Environmental Manager, Highbury College, Portsmouth. For services to Further Education.
- Margaret Pamela Green, Chairman of Governors, Ysgol Tir Morfa, Rhyl. For services to the community in Rhyl, Denbighshire.
- Mairwen Guard. For services to Animal Welfare.
- Susan Gullick, Executive Officer, Child Support Agency.
- Councillor Yash Pall Gupta, lately Member, Thurrock Borough Council and Thurrock Thames Gateway Development Board. For services to the community in Essex.
- Millicent Nellie Hadley. For services to the community in Walsall, West Midlands.
- Gregory Lane Hall, Senior Manager and Deputy Head, Guru Nanak Sikh Voluntary Aided Secondary School, Hillingdon, London. For services to Education.
- Robert Edward Hall, Managing Partner, Hall Bros, Coventry. For services to Training.
- Jill Dorothy Halliday, Span 7, Judicial Appointments Policy Division, Department for Constitutional Affairs.
- Edward Norman Hanson, Station Administrator, Horton Hospital. For services to Hospital Radio in Banbury, Oxfordshire.
- Rosemary Harley. For services to the community in Harbury, Warwickshire.
- Stephen James Harmison. For services to Cricket.
- Roy Harold, Group Manager, Buckinghamshire Fire and Rescue Service. For services to the Fire and Rescue Service.
- Jacqueline Harris, Administrative Officer, Jobcentre Plus.
- Jack Harrison, chief operating officer, Eaga Partnership. For services to Home Energy Efficiency.
- Group Captain John Seymour Hart. For services to the Royal Air Force Benevolent Fund.
- John Andrew Harvey, Commodore's House Manager, Sodexho Defence Services. For services to the Britannia Royal Naval College.
- Pearl Hassard, President, The Girls' Brigade Northern Ireland. For services to Young People.
- Brian Hedley. For public service.
- Madeline Held, director, L.L.U. London South Bank University. For services to Adult Basic Skills.
- Lilian Henderson. For services to the voluntary sector in Blackpool.
- Dr. Robert Charles William Henderson, Captain, 1st Morecambe Boys' Brigade Company. For services to Young People in Lancashire.
- Sally Heron. For services to the Royal Botanic Garden, Edinburgh.
- Colin Hignett. For services to the Royal Air Forces Association in Surrey.
- Alfred Edward Hill, Trustee and director, Freeways Trust. For services to disabled people in Bristol.
- Patricia Clare Hindley, Grade C, Olympic Games Unit, Department for Culture, Media and Sport.
- Robert Ian Hoddell, JP. For services to the Administration of Justice in Avon and Somerset.
- Richard Henry Hoddinott, Senior Plant Health and Seeds Inspector, York, Department for Environment, Food and Rural Affairs.
- Leslie Robert Hodges. For services to the community in Hitchin, Hertfordshire.
- Matthew James Hoggard. For services to Cricket.
- Joseph Holloway, Community Director, New Deal for Communities. For services to the community in Bradford, West Yorkshire.
- George Douglas Holmes, Deputy Chief Executive, Ulster-Scots Agency, Department of Culture, Arts and Leisure, Northern Ireland Executive.
- Antony David Homer, Foster Carer, Stourbridge, West Midlands. For services to Children and Families.
- Josephine Ann Homer, Foster Carer, Stourbridge, West Midlands. For services to Children and Families.
- Pamela Anne Horner, non-executive director, Doncaster East Primary Care Trust:; External Relations Manager, South Yorkshire Passenger Transport Executive. For services to the community.
- Thomas Cyril House. For services to the Royal British Legion.
- Robert Howard, Officer Instructor, HM Prison, Liverpool.
- Sandra Howard, Customer Service Officer, Jobcentre Plus.
- Susan Mary Hunt, Course Administrator, Law Department, London School of Economics. For services to Education.
- Terence William Hurd, Member, Braunstone New Deal for Communities. For services to the community in Leicester.
- Brenda Hurt. For charitable services through the Kirkby Fundraisers in Nottingham.
- Shirley Yvonne Hutson, Head Housekeeper, House of Lords.
- Derrick Edwin John Hynam. For services to the Environment and to the community in Torfaen, South Wales.
- Muhammad Iqbal, Vice-Chairman, Burngreave New Deal for Communities. For services to the community in Burngreave, Sheffield.
- Mandy Jacklin, Deputy Branch Head, Cancer Programme, Department of Health.
- Judith Jackson, Guide Guider, 125 Guides, Sheffield. For services to Young People in South Yorkshire.
- Peter Jackson. For services to Mountain Rescue in the Lake District.
- Raymond John Jackson. For services to Animal Welfare and to the community in Knutsford, Cheshire.
- Charles Treve James. For services to the community in West Cornwall.
- Shani James, Artist. For services to Art in Wales.
- Jacqueline Jarman, Higher Executive Officer, Highways Agency.
- Raymond Philip Jarvis, lately Head of Economics, Simon Langton Grammar School for Boys, Canterbury. For services to Education.
- Monica Frances Jelley, Grade B1, Prime Minister's Office.
- John Edgar Jerome, For services to the community in Aldershot, Hampshire.
- William Henry John. For services to Education in Wales.
- Geraint Owen Jones. For services to Cricket.
- Karen Linda Jones, Community Outreach Nurse, Swansea NHS Trust. For services to Healthcare.
- Maureen Jones, Project Manager, Benchill Outreach Play Project, Manchester. For services to Young People.
- Brigadier Robin James Jones, Chairman of Governors, West of England School, Exeter, Devon. For services to Special Needs Education.
- Simon Philip Jones. For services to Cricket.
- Charles Jordan, lately Chief Executive, Servol Community Trust. For services to Community Relations in the West Midlands.
- Faqir Kallow, JP, Executive Officer, The Pension Service.
- Dr. Mustafa Abdulkarim Kapasi, General Medical Practitioner, Greenock, Renfrewshire. For services to Healthcare.
- Eileen Kear, Athlete and Coach. For services to Sport.
- Dr. Dorothy Margaret Keighley, General Practice Principal, Longbridge, Birmingham. For services to Healthcare.
- Lynda Keld, lately Community Services Librarian. For services to Local Government in Portsmouth.
- Pauline Kelly, People Manager, ASDA. For services to the Department for Work and Pensions and to the Retail Industry.
- Barbara Joan Kenny. For services to Medway Magistrates Court, Kent.
- Mohammad Zafar Khan, Community Pharmacist. For services to Healthcare.
- William Kilminster, Paramedic, London Ambulance Service. For services to Healthcare.
- Andrew David Kirk, Chairman, Education Appeals Panel, Kent. For services to Education.
- Bernard Roger Kite, Chairman, Rivelin Valley Conservation Group. For services to Conservation in South Yorkshire.
- Lionel Alfred Knight, Head of History and Politics, City of London School. For services to Education.
- Alan George Knox, Paramedic, Fort William. For services to the Scottish Ambulance Service.
- Kofi Kusitor, Chairman and Chief Executive, Cursitor Group. For services to Business.
- Kevin Lambert, Chief Superintendent, Gloucestershire Constabulary. For services to the Police.
- Medha Laud, Manager, International Teams Administration, England and Wales Cricket Board. For services to Cricket.
- James William Laurenson, Storekeeper, RAF Saxa Vord, Scotland, Ministry of Defence.
- William James Lawrence. For services to Agriculture and to the community in Herefordshire.
- Godfrey David Leak. For services to Criminal Justice Agencies and to the community in Hertfordshire.
- Sylvia Rowena Leder, lately Artistic Director, The Grassington Festival. 'For services to Music in North Yorkshire.
- Colin David Lee. For services to the community in Reading, Berkshire.
- James Lee, managing director, Travel Dundee. For services to Public Transport in Scotland.
- Rosa Lee. For services to Nature Conservation in Berkshire.
- Wai Fong Lee. For services to the Chinese community in Swansea.
- Alec Nathan Leifer. For services to the community in Measham, Leicestershire.
- Elizabeth Lennon, Personal Secretary, Veterinary Sciences Division, Department of Agriculture and Rural Development, Northern Ireland Executive.
- Joyce Levy, lately Personal Assistant, Department of Trade and Industry.
- Councillor Frank William Lewis, JP, Councillor, Staffordshire County Council. For services to Local Government.
- Stanley Cornwell Lewis, Painter and Illustrator. For services to Art.
- Thelma Agnes Lewis. For services to Guyana and to the Guyanese community in the UK.
- Frank Lightfoot, Site Supervisor, Summerbank Primary School, Tunstall, Stoke-on-Trent. For services to Education.
- Jennifer Kathryn Lindley. For services to the Royal Academy of Engineering and to the Samaritans.
- Adrian Edward Alexander Lindsay. For public service.
- Brian Linfield, JP. For services to the Water Industry in the North West.
- Jill Lynette Loader. For services to the Citizens' Advice Bureau and to the British Red Cross in Bexhill-on-Sea, East Sussex.
- Robert Henry Lock, Higher Executive Officer, Wales Trade International, National Assembly for Wales.
- Francoise Claire Logan. For services to Music and to Education in Leeds.
- Giles Long, Paralympic Swimmer. For services to Disabled Sport.
- Dennis Henry Lowes, Grade C4, Accounts Branch, Finance Division, Office for National Statistics.
- Ethel Sunny Lowry. For services to Swimming in the North West of England.
- Edwin William Ludlow, Chairman, Weymouth and Portland National Sailing Academy. For services to Sailing and to the community in Weymouth.
- Bryan Lunn, Chief Examiner, Institute of Advanced Motorists. For services to Motoring.
- Marjorie Machin. For services to the British Red Cross and to the Douglas Macmillan Hospice, Stoke-on-Trent, Staffordshire.
- Christopher MacKenzie, Constable, Greater Manchester Police. For services to the Police.
- Kenneth MacKie, Chairman, Inverness, Nairn and Badenoch and Strathspey Enterprise. For services to the community in Inverness.
- Angus MacLeod, Head, School of Construction, Inverness College. For services to Education in Scotland.
- Esther MacRae, Practice Nurse. For services to the community in the Isle of Coll.
- David Magliano. For services to the London 2012 Olympic Bid.
- Paul Malcolm, Manager, HM Revenue and Customs.
- Brenda Mann, School Crossing Warden, St. Laurence Infant and Junior School, Northfield, Birmingham. For services to Education.
- Dr. Brian Marshall, General Medical Practitioner, Whalsay and Out Skerries, Shetland. For services to Healthcare.
- William McClair Marshall. For services to the Scottish Ambulance Service, Lanarkshire.
- Eric Martin. For services to the community in West Yorkshire.
- Michael Martin. For services to the Environment in the South West.
- Judith Mary Mason. For services to the Soldiers', Sailors' and Airmen's Families Association in Lancashire.
- Robert Anthony Douglas Mawson. For services to the Burma Star Association in the Isle of Man.
- William Ernest McCahon. For public service.
- Marion Elizabeth McClintock, Academic Registrar, Lancaster University. For services to Higher Education.
- Birdie McDonald, Foster Carer, London Borough of Brent. For services to Children and Families.
- James Joseph McDonnell. For services to the Soldiers', Sailors' and Airmen's Families Association in Norwich.
- Wilfred McFadden, Councillor, Banbridge District Council. For services to Local Government.
- Aileen McGlynn, Cyclist. For services to Disabled Sport.
- James Alexander McIntosh. For services to disabled people in Scotland.
- Doreen McKintosh, Chairman, Northampton Federation of Residents' Associations. For services to the community in Northampton.
- Una McLean, Actress. For services to Drama in Scotland.
- Lawrie McMenemy, Honorary Manager, Parliamentary Football Club. For services to Sport and to Charity.
- Glen William McMunn, Inspector, British Transport Police. For services to the community in London.
- Steven John McNair, Head of Aircraft Services Operations, BAE Systems. For services to the Defence Industry.
- Bernard McNamee. For services to the community in Cumbria.
- Colin Campbell McShannon, lately Deputy Governor, HM Prison Castle Huntly.
- Stephen Meakin, Member, Aspire Housing Management Board. For services to the community in Poolfields, Newcastle-under-Lyme, Staffordshire.
- Ruth Meechan, Personal Assistant and Office Manager, National Services Division, Edinburgh. For services to the NHS in Scotland.
- Maureen Kathleen Mellor, Vice-Principal, Liverpool Community College. For services to Further Education.
- William Merritt, lately vice-chairman, Clyde Valley Housing Association. For services to Social Housing in Scotland.
- Robin Holdsworth Midgley. For services to the community in Plymouth, Devon.
- Frederick John Milbourn. For services to the Horticulture Industry.
- David Richmond Miller, Chairman, League of Friends, Stroud Hospitals and Health Centre. For services to Healthcare in Gloucestershire.
- Jacqueline Amanda Miller, Grade D, Ministry of Defence.
- Patrick Wilson Milliken. For services to the community in Bangor, Northern Ireland.
- John Richard Handley Millington. For services to the Cotswolds Voluntary Warden Service and to the Sue Ryder Care Hospice in Leckhampton, Gloucestershire.
- Joan Mills, Lady. For services to the community in Crediton, Devon.
- Stephen Paul Mingay, Temporary Inspector, British Transport Police. For services to the community in London.
- Patricia Mitchell, Senior Chief Clinical Physiologist in Respiratory Physiology. For services to the NHS.
- Angela Mockler. For services to the community in Merseyside.
- Patricia Molloy. For services to disabled children in Cambridgeshire.
- Gladys Monk. For services to the community in Bacup, Lancashire.
- Teresa Margaret Moorcroft. For services to the community in Merseyside.
- Alexander Moore, Coxswain, Barrow Lifeboat, Cumbria. For services to Maritime Safety.
- Grace Morgan, Chairman of Governors, John Hanson Community School and Test Valley School, Andover, Hampshire. For services to Education.
- Brenda Pauline Morley, Chairman of Governors, Overton Grange School, Sutton, Surrey. For services to Education.
- John Prior Morris, JP. For services to the Arts and Young Peoples Theatre in Wales.
- Carolyn Moss, Occupational Health Adviser, Ordnance Survey.
- Margaret Lilian Muggridge. For services to Visually Impaired People in Norwich.
- Jean Mundell. For services to the community in Locharbriggs, Dumfries and Galloway.
- Henry Murray, lately chairman, Master Inn-holders and Hotelier. For services to the Hospitality Industry.
- Olivia Nash, Actress. For services to Drama and to Charity in Northern Ireland.
- Muhammed Rashid Nasir, board member and chairman, Tenant Management Organisation. For services to Social Housing and to the community in Kensington and Chelsea, London.
- Vernon Leslie Naylor, Drugs Co-ordinator, HM Prison Service North West Area.
- Tracey Neal, Higher Executive Officer, Child Support Agency.
- Michael Nebylowitsch, Flight Data Recording Manager, Engineering British Airways. For services to Civil Aviation.
- Dr. Joseph Bryan Nelson, Ecologist and Ethologist. For services to Marine Ornithology, especially conservation of Abbot's Booby and Christmas Island.
- Robert Newport, Camp Co-ordinator, Woodlarks Camp, Farnham, Surrey. For services to Young People.
- John Nicholas, Senior Traffic Warden, West Mercia. For services to the Police.
- Thomas Lowry Nicholl, Councillor, Ballymena Borough Council. For services to Local Government.
- Barbara Nicolson, Postmistress, Lemreway. For services to the Royal Mail and to the community in the Hebrides.
- James Nimmo, director, Corporate Services, Jewel and Esk Valley College. For services to Further Education in Scotland.
- Margaret Norris, Caterer, St. John's Church of England Infant School, Churt, Farnham, Surrey. For services to Education.
- Susan Kathleen Brien, lately Councillor, North Down Borough Council. For services to Local Government.
- Joan Pray, lately Headteacher, Sheringdale Primary School, Wandsworth, London. For services to Education.
- Josephine Mildred Sullivan. For services to Victims of Crime in the West Midlands.
- Edward Howard Oatley, Headteacher, Sevenoaks Preparatory School. For services to Education and to the community in Kent.
- Robert William Odlum. For services to the community in Newcastle-under-Lyme, Staffordshire.
- Nigel Oldacre. For services to Neighbourhood Watch in Essex.
- Christopher Oliver, Youth Worker, Woodstock Youth Club, Oxfordshire. For services to Young People.
- John Oliver. For services to Special Needs Education and to Disabled People.
- Jean Beryl Outhwaite, Chairman, Bestwood Partnerships, Bestwood Estate. For services to the community in Nottingham.
- Marie Gwendoline Owen. For services to St. John Ambulance Brigade in Manchester.
- Mary Joan Oxley, Chairman, Neath and Port Talbot Alzheimer's Disease Society. For services to the community in Neath Port Talbot.
- Josephine Mary Packer, Senior New Client Team Manager, Child Support Agency.
- Alan Painter, JP. For services to the Administration of Justice in Bedfordshire.
- Dr. Walter Duncan Park. For services to the community in Lancashire.
- Miriam Jane Parker, Member, Farm Animal Welfare Council. For services to Farming.
- Sydney Wilson Parkinson, Physiotherapist, Barnoldswick Town. For services to Football.
- Ian Michael Parks, BEM, Special Constable, Durham Constabulary. For services to the Police.
- Sylvia Rose Parrott. For services to East Africa through the charity Workaid.
- Linda Lou Alberta Parry, lately Deputy-Keeper, Furniture, Textile and Fashion Department, Victoria and Albert Museum. For services to Art.
- Jane Parsons, Executive Officer, Child Support Agency.
- Pankaj Patel. For services to Architecture.
- Gavin Alston Paterson. For services to the community in Norfolk.
- Hugh Patrick Paul, Lifeboat Boathouse Manager, Newcastle, Northern Ireland. For services to Maritime Safety.
- Susan Elizabeth Pawson, JP. For services to the Administration of Justice in Suffolk.
- Scott Peacock, Administrative Officer, Child Support Agency.
- Peter Frederick Wyndham Pember, Enquiry Centre Manager, HM Revenue and Customs.
- Naomi Mary Penfold, JP, Chairman, West Dorset District Council and North Dorset Primary Care Trust. For services to the community in Dorset.
- Robert Charles Pepper, Deputy Headteacher, Dame Alice Owen's School, Hertfordshire and Director and Conductor, English Schools Orchestra. For services to Education and Music.
- Patricia Ann Percival, Head, Corporate Communications Department, Northamptonshire Police. For services to the Police.
- Julia Lorraine Peterkin, Senior Sister, Intensive Care Unit, Royal London Hospital. For services to the NHS.
- Marjorie Phelps. For services to the community in Stroud, Gloucestershire.
- Geoffrey Howard Phillips, Foster Carer. For services to Children and Families in the Vale of Glamorgan.
- Jane Phillips, District Nurse, West Street Surgery, Chipping Norton, Oxfordshire. For services to Healthcare.
- Myra Phillips, Foster Carer. For services to Children and Families in the Vale of Glamorgan.
- Roy Phillips. For services to Crime Prevention in North Dorset.
- Lucy Barbara Picken. For services to the communities in Codmor Park and Ironville, Nottinghamshire.
- Bernard Pidcock. For services to Community Legal Services in the North East.
- Harry Anthony Pieniazek, Teacher and Physical Education Co-ordinator, Horsforth Newlaithes Junior School, West Yorkshire. For services to Education.
- Kevin Peter Pietersen. For services to Cricket.
- Nicholas Piper, director, British Boxing Board of Control. For services to Sport.
- William Pitt, Head of Service, Nuisance Strategy Group, Manchester City Council. For services to Tackling Anti-Social Behaviour.
- Robert Alexander Platt, President, Bann Rowing Club. For services to Sport in Northern Ireland.
- Ellen Player, Foster Carer, Essex County Council. For services to Children and Families.
- Harry Poloway, B.E.M., Toastmaster, Cardiff City Council and Newport City Council. For services to Local Government.
- Wing Commander Brian William Pope. For services to the community in Devon.
- John Henry Pope. For services to the Boys' Brigade in Inverkeithing, Fife.
- Ruth Margaret Popple, lately chairman, Carlisle and District Primary Care Trust. For services to Health and to the community in Cumbria.
- Philip Alan Poulton. For services to the community in Ludlow, Shropshire.
- Jacqueline Pountney, Chairman, Walsall Equestrian Society. For services to the Equestrian Industry.
- Owen Thomas Powell, Founder and leader, Keele World Affairs Group, Staffordshire. For services to Adult Education.
- Catherine Theresa Prendergast, Xerox Global Services Reprographics Specialist.
- James Walter Pullen. For charitable services in Chesterfield, Derbyshire.
- Edmund Quaynor. 'For services to the community in Bristol.
- Mary Quicke. For services to Farming in the South West.
- Ayesha Qureshi. For services to the London 2012 Olympic Bid.
- Robin Radford, Parish Councillor. For services to the community in Kensworth, Bedfordshire.
- Dr. Mohammad Rahman, General Medical Practitioner. For services to Healthcare in Gillingham, Kent.
- Jacqueline Constance Ramsden, Ranger Guider, St. Anne's-on-Sea. For services to Young People in Lancashire.
- Stanley Kenneth Ranger. For services to the Strode Park Foundation and to the community in Kent.
- Derek Rankin, RD, committee member, Clanmil Housing Association Limited. For services to Social Housing in Northern Ireland.
- Sadenia (Eddi) Reader, Singer. For services to Music.
- Irene Rees. For services to Community Transport in Powys.
- Robert Rees, Chef and Governor, British Nutrition Foundation. For services to the Food Industry.
- David Myron Alexander Reid, Director of Visa Services, Turkey, Home Office.
- Lily Reid. For services to the community in Bury, Greater Manchester.
- David John Rendall. For services to disabled people and to the community in Devon.
- Anthony Richards, JP. For services to the Millennium Centre and to the community in St. Helens, Lancashire.
- Colin John Richards, Conservation Officer, South Shropshire District Council. For services to Local Government.
- Margaret Rose Richardson. For services to the community in North Tyneside.
- Councillor Brian Dean Rigby, Chairman of Governors, West Trafford Learning Partnership, Trafford. For services to Education.
- Carol Anne Roberts. For services to Cancer Care and to the community in North West Wales.
- Margaret Mary Roberts. For services to the Water Industry in the South West.
- Norman James Alexander Robertson. For services to the community in Dundee.
- Barry Robinson, Chief Examiner and Past President of OPERC. For services to Health and Safety in Quarries.
- Gerald Robinson. For services to the communities in Staffordshire and Cheshire.
- Ronald Gilbert Robinson, Auxiliary Coastguard, Hoylake Coastguard Rescue Team. For services to Maritime Safety.
- Veronica Robinson. For services to Animal Welfare.
- Francis Patrick Rocks, Health Service Manager, Mid-Ulster. For services to the community in Northern Ireland.
- Rita Rogers. For services to the community in Melton Constable, Norfolk.
- Rachael Ronchetti, Operations Manager, Fairbridge Charity, Tyne and Wear. For services to Disadvantaged Young People.
- Florence Maud Rose. For services to the community in Wellington, Shropshire.
- Janice Ross. For services to the communities in Dulverton and Exmoor, Somerset.
- Maureen Ross, Chairman, Seaboard Memorial Hall, Tain. For services to the community in Ross-shire.
- Nancie Elizabeth Ross. For services to the community in Flackwell Heath, Buckinghamshire.
- Wendy Ross, IT Trainer and Knowledge Management Administrator. For services to the Royal Berkshire Fire and Rescue Service.
- Peter Anthony Rowe, Director-General, Institute of Credit Management. For services to Business.
- Kathleen Rowson. For services to the community in Greater Manchester.
- Mohammed Sabir. For charitable services in West Yorkshire.
- Elena Salvoni, Restaurateur and Manager, Elena's L'Etoile. For services to the Hospitality Industry.
- Tanya Samuel, Chairman, South Kilburn New Deal for Communities Board. For services to the community in South Kilburn, London.
- Malcolm Edward Sanders, Chief Executive and chairman, SCT UK Ltd. For services to Business in Wales.
- Peter Richard Sanders, Group Station Manager, London Underground. For services to Public Transport in London.
- Robert Leslie Sandling. For services to Shire Horses and to the community in Cornwall.
- Lily Sansam. For services to Deaf People in Hull.
- Angela Antonia Scarisbrick, Practice Educator for Advanced Nursing Practice, Great Ormond Street Hospital. For services to Healthcare.
- Keith Lewis Scott. For services to the community in York.
- Paul Frederick Scriven. For services to the community in Frostenden and to Heritage in Suffolk.
- Athenson Warren Seales, Operational Support Grade, HM Prison Long Lartin, Worcestershire.
- Dr. Sheila Sedgwick. For services to the community in Ballater, Deeside.
- Betty Sharp. For services to the community in Wentworth, South Yorkshire.
- Harold Sharpe, Head Coach, Special Needs Unit Gymnasts. For services to Disabled Sport.
- James Paul Shaw, Councillor and Deputy Provost, East Renfrewshire Council. For services to Local Government.
- Roy Peter Shore. For services to Scouting in Bristol and to the Friendship Medical Clinic in Nepal.
- Margaret Jane Shuttleworth. For services to the Friends of Dumfries Prison.
- Diana Rae Simpson. For services to the Royal Mail and to the Macmillan Cancer Relief Trust.
- Jean Sinton. For services to the community in Coln St. Aldwyns, Gloucestershire.
- Dr. Teoman Necati Sirri, General Medical Practitioner. For services to Healthcare and to Greek and Turkish Cypriot People in London.
- Ralph Sixsmith, Chairman, Dearne Valley Venture. For services to Young People in South Yorkshire.
- Mabel Slater, Director of Professions Complementary to Dentistry, Guy's, King's and St. Thomas' NHS Trust. For services to Dental Health.
- Ruth Constance Small. For services to Disabled Sport.
- Anne Catherine Smith, leader, Conservative Group, Sheffield City Council. For services to Local Government.
- Beryl Smith. For services to the community in Brandon, Warwickshire.
- David Leonard Smith, JP. For services to the community in Oxford.
- Derek Duncan Smith. For services to disabled people in Rutland.
- Dr. Francis Mark Smith. For services to the community in East Manchester.
- George Maxwell Smith. For services to the community in Strathnairn, Inverness.
- Jean Jillian Smith, Project Manager, Nilaari Agency, Bristol. For services to People who Misuse Drugs, especially those from the Black and Minority communities.
- Norman Alan Smith, Handyman, Haxby Road Primary School, York. For services to Education.
- Patricia Gloria Smith, Executive Officer, Jobcentre Plus.
- Richard Smith, Chairman, Friends of Arnos Vale and the Arnos Vale Cemetery Trust. For services to conservation in Bristol.
- Margaret Elizabeth Spittles, lately Superintendent Registrar for Oxfordshire. For services to Local Government.
- Alan Paul Stacey. For services to Disabled and Elderly People in Hounslow, Middlesex.
- Thomas Hardy Stanton. For services to the community in Shropshire.
- The Reverend Christopher Stark, Foster Carer. For services to Children and Families in North Yorkshire.
- Kathleen Stark. Foster Carer. For services to Children and Families in North Yorkshire.
- Barbara Steele, lately Senior Mid-day Assistant, Taporley Community High School, Cheshire. For services to Education.
- George Stewart Stevenson, director, GSS Developments. For services to the community in Aberdeen.
- Henry Robert Hunter Stinson, Life President, British Athletics Supporters' Club and Honorary Life Vice-President, International Association of Athletics Federations. For services to Sport.
- Joseph Allan Stoney. For services to Farming in Nidderdale, North Yorkshire.
- Gillian Strachan, Service Manager, NCH Scotland, Children's Charity. For services to Children and Families.
- Dr. Rae Hervey Straton. For services to the community in Fordingbridge, Hampshire.
- Andrew John Strauss, For services to Cricket.
- Richard Sumray, Chairman, London 2012 Forum. For services to the London 2012 Olympic Bid.
- Peter James Swan, Paramedic and Team Leader, Ambulance Service. For services to Healthcare.
- James Michael Taylor, Member, Management Committee, Ponteland Scout Group, Newcastle upon Tyne. For services to Young People.
- Laurence James Taylor, Grade C1, Ministry of Defence.
- Jean Alice Tennant. For services to the Environment and to the community in Oldham.
- Jatinder Kumari Thind, Higher Executive Officer Caseworker, Crown Prosecution Service.
- Elizabeth Ann Thomas. For services to the community in Llandovery, Carmarthenshire.
- Jean Gwendolene Thomas, Head of Nursing and Counselling Occupational Health, Metropolitan Police Service. For services to Healthcare.
- Dr. John Thomas, Treasurer and Trustee, YMCA South East Region and Honorary Secretary and Treasurer, YMCA Woking. For services to Young People.
- Alison Thompson, HM Coroner, West London. For services to Disaster Relief.
- Phillip Martin Thorne, Principal Teacher of Music, St. David's Roman Catholic High School, Dalkeith. For services to Education in Scotland.
- Fiona Thornewill. For services to Charity and to Polar Exploration.
- Dorothy Moor Tilbury. For services to Cycling, Philately and to the community in the Isle of Man.
- Robert Thomas Tilling. For services to Arts in Jersey.
- Alexandra, Mrs. Timpson, Foster Carer, Cheshire County Council. For services to Children and Families.
- Brian Tipper, lately Work Services Clock Technician, Palace of Westminster.
- Diana Joan Toole. For services to the Cheshire Home and to the Methodist Church in Jersey.
- Christine Townend, Senior Lunchtime Supervisor, Eastwood Primary School, Keighley, West Yorkshire. For services to Education.
- Marcus Edward Trescothick. For services to Cricket.
- Alan John Trice, Chairman of Fund-raising, Hemlington Detached Youth Work Project Ltd. For services to Young People in Teesside.
- David James Trigger, Warehouse Supervisor, HM Naval Base, Devonport, Ministry of Defence.
- James Neill Turver, Head of Resettlement, HM Prison Kirklevington Grange, Cleveland.
- James Arthur Underdown, lately Paramedic, London Ambulance Service. For services to Healthcare.
- Trevor Butler Vaughan, Service Awards Manager, London Ambulance Service NHS Trust. For services to Health and to the Police.
- Anne Vince, Secretary, Council for Higher Education in Art and Design. For services to Higher Education.
- Thanh Khanh Vu. For services to the Vietnamese community in Hackney, London.
- Timothy Raymond Wade, Duty Line Manager, London Underground. For services to Public Transport in London.
- Paul Victor Wagstaffe, Vice-President, Inland Waterways Association. For services to Inland Waterways.
- Joyce Shelagh Walden. For services to the Sea Cadet Corps in Henley-on-Thames.
- Anthony Norman Andrews Walker, Director of Student Services, Barony College. For services to Further Education in Scotland.
- Douglas Auburn Walker. For services to the community in Dacorum, Hertfordshire.
- Ian Walker, Local Government Officer, Camden Council. For services to Local Government in London.
- Johnnie Walker, Radio Presenter. For services to Broadcasting.
- Richard Jenkyn Walters, librarian, Records and Information Openness Team, Information Services Division, Department for Education and Skills.
- Diane Waltho, Administrative Officer, Jobcentre Plus.
- Dr. John Ovelin Wand, Research Manager, Engineering and Physical Sciences, Research Council. For services to Science.
- Peter Esslemont Ward, lately Member, Joint Children's Panel Advisory Committee for Clackmannanshire, Falkirk and Stirling. For services to Children.
- Sylvia Ward. For services to Jobcentre Plus in the North East.
- Kenneth Johnston Wards. For services to the Royal Air Forces Association, Shoreham-by-Sea, West Sussex.
- Joyce Warrington. For services to Dance in Morecambe, Lancashire.
- Elizabeth Watson. For services to Tackling Anti-Social Behaviour in Broomhouse, Edinburgh.
- Geoffrey Watts, JP, Assistant Principal, St. Neots Community School, St. Neots, Cambridgeshire. For services to Education.
- Nicholas Watts. For services to Farming and to Conservation in Lincolnshire.
- Roy Thomas Webb, Contract Operations Manager, London Ambulance Service. For services Healthcare.
- Ronald Webster, Member, National Association of Retired Police Officers, Greater Manchester Police. For services to the community in Manchester.
- Melvyn Weinberg, lately Executive Marketing Director, Jewish Chronicle. For services to the Newspaper Industry.
- Sarah Jane Weir, School Secretary, Rathfriland High School. For services to Education in Northern Ireland.
- Charles Henry Welton. For services to Nottingham Samaritans.
- Isabelle Sarah White. For services to Save the Children UK and to the Tibetan community.
- Dr. Mary White, Chairman, Bromsgrove Music Festival. For services to Music.
- Lewis Whitehead. For services to the community in Barnsley, South Yorkshire.
- John William Whiteley. For services to Rugby League and to the community in Hull and East Yorkshire.
- Michael Whittingham, Grade C2, Ministry of Defence.
- Dennis Widdick. For services to the Royal British Legion in Braintree, Essex.
- Jacqueline Widdows. For services to the community in Woodcote, Reading.
- John Ingram Willder, lately Management Information Systems Manager, Gateway Sixth Form College, Leicester. For services to Further Education.
- Richard Medwyn Williams, Chairman, National Vegetable Society (President, Welsh Branch), Broadcaster and Writer. For services to Horticulture.
- Professor David Wilson, Visiting Professor in Waste Management, Imperial College, University of London. For services to Waste Management in the UK and Europe.
- Rhonda Wilson. For services to Photography and to International Trade.
- Tracy Maria Wilson, Nursery Manager, Duchy of Cornwall. 'For services to Horticulture.
- Stephen Wiltshire, Artist. For services to Art.
- Jane Helen Winstanley, general manager, Cotswold Council for Voluntary Service Ltd. For services to the community in Gloucestershire.
- Owen Reginald Wiscombe. For services to the community in Jersey.
- David Leonard Wood, Vehicle Inspector, Vehicle and Operator Services Agency.
- Neil Wood. For services to the London 2012 Olympic Bid.
- Cyril Leslie Woodall, Councillor, Dudley Metropolitan Borough Council. For services to Local Government.
- Clifford Lewis Woods, Higher Executive Officer, Student Finance and Mandatory Awards Team, Higher Education Directorate, Department for Education and Skills.
- Sarah Elizabeth Wooller. For services to Hope House Children's Hospices in North Wales and Shropshire.
- Peggy Wotton. For services to the communities in the Rural Parishes of Strawley (including Greenham) and Ashbrittle, Somerset.
- Anthony John Wright, Radio Presenter, Capital Gold. For charitable services in South Wales.
- Bernard Wright. For services to Ornithology and to Conservation.
- Eric Gordon Wright, Forest Craftsman, Forestry Commission, North West England Forest District.
- Dr. Gillian Wright, European Principal Investigator, James Webb Space Telescope-Mid-Infrared Instrument, Particle Physics and Astronomy Research Council. For services to Science.
- Jane Wright, Chairman, Association of West Coast Fisheries Trusts. For services to Freshwater Fisheries.
- Rachel Yankey, Footballer, Arsenal Ladies' Football Club and England. For services to Sport.
- Anne Yendall, Nursing Auxiliary, Somme Nursing Home. For services to the community in Belfast.
- Derek Young, JP. For services to Sea Fishing Charities.
- Mohammed Younis, Postman. For services to charity and to the Royal Mail.

Diplomatic Division

- Julian James Astle, lately Political Adviser, Office of the High Representative for Bosnia and Herzegovina.
- Alisdair Forsyth Barron. For services to sick children in Romania.
- John Patrick Cyprian Baskett, Honorary Consul, Medan.
- Andrew Sandys Bate, President, Euro-De"fense UK.
- Martin Peter Bentley. For services to education and sport in Kenya.
- Clyde Cyril Best. For services to football and the community in Bermuda.
- Diane Blair (Lester). For services to mental health in Nigeria.
- Mary Browning-Grace Ann, For services to UK-Japanese relations.
- Susan Jayne Burden, Third Secretary, Foreign and Commonwealth Office.
- Martin Charles Richard Carpenter. For services to victims of the Indian Ocean tsunami in Thailand.
- Joseph Douglas Catania. For public service, Gibraltar.
- Naomi Guenett Clapham. For services to the British community in Algeria.
- Dr. Jane Alison Conlon. For services to disadvantaged communities in South Africa.
- Alan Robert Cooke, Honorary Consul, Phuket.
- Alison Elizabeth Coutts, lately Director, British Council, St. Petersburg.
- Sister Elizabeth Dawson. For services to disadvantaged children and to special needs education in Zambia.
- John Bradman Douglas, Commissioner of Police, Montserrat.
- Joyce Angela George. For services to the community, St. Helena.
- Steve Walter George Grant, Visits Officer, UK Permanent Representation to the European Union.
- Howard Laurence Griffiths. For services to music and the community in Switzerland.
- Lady Louisa Josephine Gumbs. For services to the community, Anguilla.
- Richard Wilkie Haldane, Organiser of the Great Russia Race. For charitable services to disadvantaged children in Russia.
- Sylvia Anne Harcourt. For services to environmental conservation and to British education in Ecuador.
- Christopher Peter Motte Harrison. For services to education in Burma and to UK-Burmese relations.
- Dr. Harold Hart. For services to UK-Israeli relations.
- John Richard Kane. For services to sport and the community, Bermuda.
- Ann Vanessa Kelly. For services to the community in Barbados.
- Kathleen Margaret Kimura. For services to British business interests in California.
- Mary Elizabeth Lack. For services to disadvantaged communities in South Africa.
- Paul Philip Lane, Registrar, British High Commission, Kingston.
- Fiona Jane Lavender (Borisuth), lately Third Secretary and Vice-Consul, British Embassy, Bangkok.
- Gordon Wilfred Long. For services to veterans of the Arctic Convoys and to UK-Russian relations.
- Major James Murdoch MacLeod. For services to ex-service men and women in the UK and Ireland and to UK-Irish relations.
- Amanda Louise Marshall, Deputy Director of Communications, British High Commission, Singapore.
- Susan Elizabeth Gould De Mayer. For services to British education in Mexico.
- Brian Arthur Charles Mayhew. For services to wildlife conservation in Africa.
- Kevin Thomas McCarthy. For services to British education in the Netherlands.
- David John Muir, Second Secretary, Foreign and Commonwealth Office.
- Colin William Murphy, Co-ordinator of the Churches Programme, Glencree Centre for Peace and Reconciliation, Ireland.
- Lucy Elizabeth Ellen Norton. For services to victims of the Indian Ocean tsunami in Thailand.
- Peter Vivian Oats. For services to ex-service men and women in Chile.
- Brian Alexander Ormston, lately Pro-Consul, British Embassy, Madrid.
- Ian John Patrick, lately Private Secretary to the High Representative for Bosnia and Herzegovina.
- John Carlon Powery. For public service, Cayman Islands.
- Cynthia Marjorie Ratcliffe. For services to disadvantaged children and to victims of the Indian Ocean tsunami in Thailand.
- Ian Alexander Probert Roger. For services to ex-service men and women in the USA and UK.
- Audrey Elizabeth Rogers. For services to the community, Anguilla.
- Jeanette Short. For services to the education of blind people in India.
- Peter Alwyn Skinner. For services to veterans of the Arctic Convoys and to UK-Russian relations.
- Jean Marguerite Spear. For services to UK-Canadian relations.
- Roberta Anne Stayte, lately Pro-Consul, British Consulate, Seattle.
- James Daniel Stephenson, First Secretary, Foreign and Commonwealth Office.
- Maureen Stewart, Manager, British Council, Bulawayo.
- Haroon Suleman, Second Secretary, British High Commission, Colombo.
- James Anthony Sweetman. For services to the British community in Ivory Coast.
- Patricia Anne Swinfen, Lady. For services to telemedicine overseas.
- Mark Ronald Taylor, First Secretary, Foreign and Commonwealth Office.
- Carole Ann Turner, lately Chief Passport Examiner, British High Commission, Canberra.
- Ian Stuart Walker. For services to rugby football and the community in Uganda.
- Lillian Wilbourn, lately Registrar, British Embassy, Kuwait.
- Glenys Winstone. For services to the British community, especially older people, in the USA.
- Dr. Leslie John Zammitt. For services to drama in Gibraltar.

=== Queen's Police Medal ===
==== England and Wales ====
- Martin Peter Baker, Chief Constable, Dorset Police.
- Janette Berry, Chief Inspector, Chairman, Police Federation of England and Wales.
- Kevin Bowsher, Chief Inspector, Metropolitan Police Service.
- Della Mary Cannings, Chief Constable, North Yorkshire Police.
- Michael Craik, Chief Constable, Northumbria Police.
- James Dickie, Detective Superintendent, Metropolitan Police Service.
- Clinton Edward Elliott, general secretary, Police Federation of England and Wales.
- Patricia Ferguson Gallan, Assistant Chief Constable, National Crime Squad.
- Steven Barry Greenacre, Inspector, Greater Manchester Police.
- Meredydd John Hughes, Chief Constable, South Yorkshire Police.
- Davina Jessie Logan, Deputy Chief Constable, Northamptonshire Police.
- Douglas Gardner McKenna, Detective Superintendent, Metropolitan Police Service.
- David John Murray, Chief Superintendent, Thames Valley Police.
- John Raymond Prunty, Detective Superintendent, Metropolitan Police Service.
- Terence Lewis Anthony Ward, Constable, Merseyside Police.
- John Horace Wood, Chief Superintendent, Staffordshire Police.
- John Yates, Deputy Assistant Commissioner, Metropolitan Police Service.

==== Scotland ====
- William Bald, Deputy Chief Constable, Tayside Police.
- James Hudson Green, Chief Superintendent, Strathclyde Police.
- Brian Powrie, Chief Superintendent, Tayside Police.

==== Northern Ireland ====
- Robert John McKernan, Detective Inspector, Police Service of Northern Ireland.
- Paul Richard Sterritt, Constable, Police Service of Northern Ireland.
- Gary Francis Stewart, Superintendent, Police Service of Northern Ireland.

=== Queen's Fire Service Medal ===
==== England and Wales ====
- Richard Brabbs, Station Officer, West Yorkshire Fire Service.
- Anthony McGuirk, chief fire officer, Merseyside Fire and Rescue Service.
- Stephen Myers, chief fire officer, Surrey Fire and Rescue Service.
- Kenneth Seager, Deputy chief fire officer, Suffolk Fire and Rescue Service.
- Ronald Taylor, chief fire officer, Guernsey Fire Brigade.

==== Scotland ====
- Norman Burns, Retained Sub Officer, Sanquhar Fire Station.
- Andrew Whyte Harrison, Assistant Inspector, Her Majesty's Fire Service Inspectorate.

=== Queen's Volunteer Reserves Medal ===
==== Royal Navy ====
- Commander Brian Brockie, Royal Naval Reserve.
- Lieutenant Commander Simon John D'Arcy Ryan, RD, Royal Naval Reserve.

==== Army ====
- The Reverend Richard Thomas Grey, TD (506796), Chaplain to the Forces (3rd Class), Royal Army Chaplains' Department, Territorial Army.
- Warrant Officer Class 2 Michael John McCann (23916950), Royal Army Medical Corps, Territorial Army.
- Colonel Jeremy Peter Mooney, TD (512362), late The London Regiment, Territorial Army.
- Major David Stuart Smith, TD (532435), The Royal Logistic Corps, Territorial Army.
- Lieutenant Colonel Keiron Andrew Spires, TD (510243), Queen Alexandra's Royal Army Nursing Corps, Territorial Army.

==== Air Force ====
- Warrant Officer Patricia Ann Harris (R2625604), Royal Auxiliary Air Force.

== Crown Dependencies ==
=== The Most Excellent Order of the British Empire ===
==== Officer of the Order of the British Empire (OBE) ====
Guernsey

- David Lowe for his services to the Guernsey Royal Court.

==== Member of the Order of the British Empire (MBE) ====
Guernsey

- Ben Remfrey, for worldwide humanitarian work in the field of mines awareness
- Colin John Fallaize for services to the community in Guernsey.

Jersey

- Diana Joan Toole, for services to the Cheshire Home and to the Methodist Church in Jersey
- Nicholas Philip Cabot, for services to Choral Music in Jersey.
- Robert Thomas Tilling, for services to Arts in Jersey.

Isle of Man

- Robert Anthony Douglas Mawson, for services to the Burma Star Association in the Isle of Man
- Edna May Ainge, for services to Disabled People in the Isle of Man
- Dorothy Moor Tilbury, fFor services to Cycling, Philately and to the community in the Isle of Man.

=== Queen's Fire Service Medal ===
Guernsey

- Ronald Taylor, chief fire officer, Guernsey Fire Brigade.

== Grenada ==
=== Order of the British Empire ===
==== Members of the Order of the British Empire (MBE) ====
Civil Division

- Esther Henry-Fleary. For public service.
- Trevor Modeste. For public service.

==== British Empire Medal ====
Civil Division

- Andrew Noel. For services to construction and the community.

== Solomon Islands ==
=== Order of the British Empire ===
==== Officers of the Order of the British Empire (OBE) ====
- William Morrell. For services to the Royal Solomon Islands Police.
- John Tuhaika. For public service.

Civil Division

==== British Empire Medal ====
Civil Division

- Queenie Lee. For services to social development.

== Tuvalu ==
=== Order of the British Empire ===
==== Officers of the Order of the British Empire (OBE) ====
Civil Division

- Siliga Kofe. For public and community service.

==== Members of the Order of the British Empire (MBE) ====
Civil Division

- Miliama Mauga. For public and community service.
- Talivai Sovala. For services to the community.
- Falasa Teafiula. For services to the community.

==== British Empire Medal ====
Civil Division

- Iosefa Lagafaoa. For public and community service.
- Semeli Sio. For service to the community.
- Teoti Vakai. For public and community service.

== Belize ==
=== Order of Saint Michael and Saint George ===
==== Companions of Saint Michael and Saint George (CMG) ====
- Robert Leslie. For services to diplomacy and government administration.

=== Order of the British Empire ===
==== Officers of the Order of the British Empire (OBE) ====
Civil Division

- Hector Silva, Sr. For services to business and the Government.
- Lynn Young. For services to business and industry.

==== Members of the Order of the British Empire (MBE) ====
Civil Division

- Arsenio Burgos. For services to business and industry.
- Marion Marsden. For services to business and social development.
- Sarkis Abou-Nehra. For services to industry and diplomacy.
- Rene Villanueva, Snr. For services to the community and the Media.
- Olive Woodye. For services to teaching and social development.

== Saint Vincent and the Grenadines ==
=== Order of Saint Michael and Saint George ===
==== Knights Commander of the Order of Saint Michael and Saint George (KCMG) ====
- The Honourable Louis Hilton Straker. For services to Parliament and the Ministry of Foreign Affairs.

==== Companions of the Order of Saint Michael and Saint George (CMG) ====
- The Very Reverend Patrick Ezekiel McIntosh. For services to the church and the community.

=== Order of the British Empire ===
==== Officers of the Order of the British Empire (OBE) ====
Civil Division

- Dr. Elsworth Harvy Charles. For services to medicine.
- Arthur Francis Williams. For services to law and the community.

==== Members of the Order of the British Empire (MBE) ====
Civil Division

- Valcina Agatha Greaves-Ash. For services to business and the community.
- Angela Vita Hinkson. For services to business and the community.
- Cyprian Zephrin Hypolite. For services to the insurance business and the community.

== Saint Christopher and Nevis ==
=== Order of Saint Michael and Saint George ===
==== Companions of Saint Michael and Saint George (CMG) ====
- Cedric Lanyon Harper. For public service.

=== Order of the British Empire ===
==== Officers of the Order of the British Empire (OBE) ====
Civil Division

- Walford Gumbs. For services to trade unionism.

==== Members of the Order of the British Empire (MBE) ====
Civil Division

- Raphael Adonis Archibald. For public service.
- Hilary Elizabeth Wattley. For public service.
