= Stephen Moss (disambiguation) =

Stephen Moss may refer to:

- Stephen Moss, British natural historian, birder, author and television producer
- Sir Stephen Moss (nurse) (born 1947), British nurse
- Steve Moss (editor) (1948–2005), American editor and publisher
- Steven Moss (American author) (1962–2025), American writer and professor
- Stephen P. Moss (1840–1917), American rancher, businessman and state legislator
- Steve Moss (musician), American multi-instrumentalist
- Steve Moss (politician) (born 1950), American politician
