= Jeffrey James West =

British civil servant (1950–2022)

Jeffrey James West OBE FSA FRSA
- Born: 15 October 1950
- Died: 4 December 2022 (aged 72)
- Education: Bedford Modern School
- Alma mater: Worcester College, Oxford
- Known for: Principal Inspector of Historic Buildings, English Heritage (1983–86)

Reverend Canon Jeffrey James West OBE FSA FRSA (15 October 1950 – 4 December 2022) was a British Anglican priest who was the Principal Inspector of Historic Buildings, English Heritage (1983–1986). Since 2017 he has been an Honorary Canon of Christ Church Cathedral, Oxford.

== Early life ==
West was born on 15 October 1950, the son of Walter Edward West and Francis Margaret West (née Tatam). He was educated at Bedford Modern School and Worcester College, Oxford.

== Career ==
In 1974, West joined the Ancient Monuments Inspectorate at the Department of the Environment and became an Assistant Inspector (1974–79) and an Inspector (1979–81). He was then seconded as Principal, Local Government Finance, Department of the Environment (1981–83) and later became Principal Inspector of Historic Buildings at what is now known as English Heritage (1983–86).

West continued at English Heritage becoming Regional Director of Historic Properties (Midlands and East Anglia) between 1986 and 1997; Director of Conservation Management (1998–2002) and Policy Director (2002–2005).

In 2005, he took the decision to train for the priesthood and was ordained in 2008. In 2012, he was appointed Rural Dean for Deddington in the Episcopal Area of Dorchester. From 2009 to 2014, he was Chairman of the Cotswold Conservation Board.

== Honours and fellowships ==
West was appointed Officer of the Order of the British Empire (OBE) in the 2006 New Year Honours for services to the historic environment.

He became a Fellow of the Royal Society of Arts in 2001. He was elected a Fellow of the Society of Antiquaries of London on 6 June 2011.

== Personal life ==
West was married in 1987 to Juliet Elizabeth Allan. He died on 4 December 2022, at the age of 72.

== Bibliography ==
J.J. West and N. Palmer, Haughmond Abbey, Shropshire: Excavation of a 12th-Century Cloister in its Historical and Landscape Context (English Heritage Books, 2014)
