= Beryl Corner =

Pioneering paediatrician

Beryl Corner

Beryl Dorothy Corner OBE (1910–2007) was a medical doctor and committed Christian who specialised in the care and treatment of children and pioneered neonatology – care of the newborn.

She excelled as a medical student at the London School of Medicine for Women but then had trouble finding a post at institutions like Great Ormond Street Hospital because she was a woman. She established a career at the Bristol Royal Hospital for Children and, for several years, she was the only paediatrician in South West England. She was admitted to the British Paediatric Association in 1945. Corner established a unit to care for newborn babies. With a budget of £100 she was able to halve mortality rates. In 1948 she was the consultant paediatrician who oversaw the first caesarian birth of four quads born at Bristol.

Corner was appointed an Officer of the Order of the British Empire in the 2006 New Year's Honours list shortly before she died in 2007, aged 96.
