= Madeline Held =

British academic (1944–2020)

Madeline Held MBE (1944, in Corbridge, Northumberland – 2020, in London) was a British academic in the Faculty of Arts and Human Sciences, London South Bank University. She had been the Director of the LLU+ (formerly the London Language and Literacy Unit). The unit ran the largest professional development centre in the UK, undertaking capacity building for teacher training in further, higher and community education.

== Awards and honours ==
Held was awarded an MBE for services to Adult Basic Skills in the 2006 New Year Honours List.
