= Kathleen Kiernan =

Demographer

Kathleen Kiernan OBE FBA
- Occupation: Demographer
- Employer: University of York
- Title: Emeritus Professor of Social Policy and Demography
- Awards: Officer of the Order of the British Empire; Fellow of the British Academy

Kathleen Kiernan OBE FBA is a Demographer. She is Emeritus Professor of Social Policy and Demography at the University of York. Kiernan joined the university in October 2004 from her previous role as Professor of Social Policy and Demography at the London School of Economics. She was awarded an OBE for services to Social Science in the 2006 New Year Honours and was elected as a fellow of the British Academy in 2012.
