= Nazia Khanum =

British management consultant (born 1943)

Dr Nazia Khanum OBE, DL
- নাজিয়া খানম
- Born: 1943 (age 82–83); Barisal, Bengal Presidency (now Bangladesh), British India
- Education: BA and MA political science, PhD history
- Alma mater: University of Dhaka; School of Oriental and African Studies
- Occupations: Management consultant, researcher, academic, social activist
- Years active: 1983–present
- Title: Director of Equality in Diversity, non-executive director for NHS Luton
- Spouse: David Cheesman
- Children: 1

Nazia Khanum DL (Bengali: নাজিয়া খানম; born 1943) is a Bangladeshi-born British management consultant, researcher, Director of Equality in Diversity, non-executive director for NHS Luton and chair of various voluntary community organisations.

== Early life ==
Khanum was born in Barisal, in British India (now Bangladesh). Her exact date of birth is unknown because during that period birth certificates were not given unless they were specifically requested. She was named by her father Late Shamsul Ulama (Sun of Scholar) Mawlana Naseer Ahmed Khan, a graduate from Aligarh Muslim University in India, double gold medalists. While studying there, he played an active role in the anti-British movement. He was the superintendent of the Alyah Madrasah in Calcutta (www.aliah.ac.in/), and served from 1925 to 1935 at Bhola Ulum Hadis Kamil Mastars Madrasah (installed in 1913) was a member of the Congress in Calcutta under Mahatma Gandhi, and was an active in the anti-British movement (1905). Later in 1925 he served in Bhola Islamia Madrasa presently known as Bhola Darul Hadis Kamil-Masters Madrasa (established in 1913). in last decade of 17th century Nazia's grand father came from Persia for business trade and spread education in India, later he settled in Southern part of Shabazpur a remote village of Hizla-Muladi of Barisal under Mughals. Nazia's father moved to Charfassion with his family from South Shahbazpur in British regime. Her father died in 1951 when she was very young. She moved with her family to Charfassion, Bhola and later Dhaka where she was brought up. In the early 1980s, she brought her family to Luton, Bedfordshire, England.

== Education and career ==
Khanum has an BA and MA in political science from the University of Dhaka, and a PhD in history from the School of Oriental and African Studies, University of London.

She worked over a long period as a lecturer and later as an assistant professor in Eden Girls' College and the University of Dhaka in Bangladesh.

In 1996, Khanum set up an independent international equal opportunities/diversity management, research and training consultancy. She is a non-executive director for NHS Luton.

Since 1983, Khanum has been involved in community empowerment through her work with diverse communities, across the United Kingdom to promote their development and empowerment. She has extensive senior management experience with five English local authorities (Ealing, Tower Hamlets, Bedfordshire, GLC and ILEA). She is on the boards of several key decision-making and community-empowerment organisations, including: non-executive director of Luton Primary Care Trust. She chairs several community groups in Luton She is on the boards of several key decision-making and community-empowerment organisations, including: non-executive director of Luton Primary Care Trust, member of the corporation and governor of Luton Sixth Form College. Chair of Luton All-Women's Centre, Luton Multi-Cultural Women's Coalition, including Luton Bangladesh Helping Hand and Purbachal – the Eastern Sky. She is a member of the Government's Muslim Women's Advisory Group and a government equality ambassador for the Eastern Region.

Khanum was a government adviser. on issues relating to ethnic minorities. In 2006, Khanum began a research study, for the Home Office and Metropolitan Police Service, of forced marriage in Luton. Published in March 2008, the study found that support organisations in Luton were approached with enquiries about forced marriage more than 300 times each year. The results suggest that several thousand young women are the victims of forced marriages in Britain each year.

== Awards and recognition ==
In 2006, Khanum was appointed an Officer of the Order of the British Empire (OBE) in the 2006 New Year Honours for her services to equal opportunities and community relations. She holds an honorary doctorate from University of Bedfordshire.

== Personal life ==
Khanum is married to David Cheesman, a professor of society and development at Sheffield Hallam University. Their son, Tareen, has an MSc in economics from the London School of Economics and Political Science, University of London. In November 2002, Khanum and her husband performed their first Hajj (the largest Islamic pilgrimage to Mecca, Saudi Arabia).

== See also ==
- British Bangladeshi
- List of British Bangladeshis
