= Marianne de Trey =

British studio potter

Marianne de Trey CBE
- Born: 3 November 1913; London
- Died: 18 October 2016 (aged 102)
- Education: Royal College of Art
- Known for: Significant impact on the craft's post World War II revival

Marianne de Trey CBE (3 November 1913 – 18 October 2016) was a pioneering British studio potter whose work had a significant impact on the craft's post World War II revival.

== Biography ==
De Trey was born in London to Swiss parents, Emma (née Lehmann) and Auguste de Trey, who distributed false teeth for an American supplier. After boarding school, she studied textiles at the Royal College of Art London where she graduated in 1936. On 11 February 1938 she married artist Thomas Samuel Haile. The couple traveled to the US in 1939 due to Haile's anti-war beliefs, and there de Trey gained a passion for pottery. However, in 1943, he was forced to join the US Army until the end of World War II. The couple returned to England in 1945, and Haile died in a road accident in 1948 while de Trey was pregnant. Their daughter was born later that year.

De Trey and two of her sisters started producing pottery at Dartington, in Devon, and by 1950 she was employing three people, she would go on to run her pottery company, Shinner's Bridge Pottery for over 30 years. She was a founder member of the Devon Guild of Craftsmen and Craft Potters Association.

When her pottery studio burned down due in 1957 to an electrical fault, de Trey changed her focus from earthenware to stoneware. In 1976, she established a training workshop adjacent to her pottery. She retired from production work in 1980, and changed focus to individual work. She was made a CBE for services to the arts in the 2006 New Year Honours.

De Trey died on 18 October 2016 and according to her obituary in the Guardian, her work had a significant impact on the craft's post World War II revival.

== Collections ==
- Victoria and Albert Museum
- Aberystwyth University Ceramics Collection
