= Paul Kan Man-Lok =

Paul Kan Man-lok CBE GCM KCGC CommOSSI ChevalierLdHonneur SBS JP (簡文樂; born 1947) is a Chinese technology engineer.

== Career ==
Paul Kan was a programmer of the Hong Kong Government in the 1960s, providing software expertise to various government departments including education, transport, security, industry and trade. Over the next 17 years, he worked with various international groups as a systems analyst for computer projects, including the Swire Group for its aviation, trading and shipping systems. He was ultimately promoted to be the General Manager of Asiadata Ltd, a joint venture computing services bureau of HSBC, Jardines, Barclays Bank and Cable & Wireless. In 1987, he founded the Champion Technology Group and soon launched the world's first Chinese message receiver and wireless communication system. The Champion Technology Group has since positioned itself in the development of wireless communications software and related applications in various environments. Products of the Group are distributed in over 50 countries.

He is credited with having developed the world's first Chinese and multi-lingual wireless communication software/system in 1987 and is renowned as the "Father of Multi-lingual Messaging" for pioneering the wireless communication transmission software in various languages. He has made significant contributions to the information technology industry in both Hong Kong and China over the last 39 years and was formerly the chairman of three information technology companies (Champion Technology Holdings, Kantone Holdings, and Digital Hong Kong.com) which are listed on the Hong Kong Stock Exchange. The total asset value of the three companies exceeds 6 billion dollars. He is also an independent non-executive director of CLP Holdings Ltd.

Kan resigned from his board positions in Champion Technology and Kantone Holdings in September 2016. In November 2020 he was arrested along with seven other people connected to Champion Technology and Kantone Holdings in relation to an HK$8.5 billion false accounting case involving the two firms. According to a statement by Hong Kong Exchanges and Clearing, the two firms purchased 371 cultural products such as Tianhuang stones, constituting 92% of the firms' total assets as of June 2016, but the firms could not prove that any professional appraisal or authentication of the assets in question had been carried out. Subsequent to an expert appraisal of the objects in question, in 2017 and 2018 the firms had impairment losses of over HK$8.4 billion in 2017 and 2018.

== Other activities ==
Paul Kan is currently chairman of the Hong Kong IT Alliance; Chairman of the Hong Kong Information Technology Industry Council; Chairman of Information and Communications Technology Services Advisory Committee, HKTDC; chairman of ICT Working Group, the Hong Kong–United Kingdom Business Partnership; and convener of the Hungarian–Hong Kong Innovative Business Council.

In 1990, Kan set up A Better Tomorrow, a charity which has since contributed to community programs in education, arts, culture and religion. The cultural activities increased substantially over the years and in 2005, Kan set up as separate non profit organizations and registered as charities the Chinese Cultural Heritage Protection Foundation for Heritage activities and to save world relics by the World Cultural Relics Protection Foundation.

== Awards ==
He was named to the Order of the British Empire by Queen Elizabeth II as a Commander in the 2006 New Year's Honours List. This award recognised Kan's contribution to business and high standard of management ethics in his business endeavours.

Kan was invested with the honour of Commendatore dell'Ordine della Stella della Solidarieta Italiana (Comm OSSI) by the Italian Prime Minister Romano Prodi in 2006. The award is granted to recipients in recognition of their contribution to economic and cultural activities for Italy.

He was awarded Chevalier de la Légion d'Honneur by the French Government in 2007 and received it from Anne-Marie Idrac, Secretary for Foreign Trade of France in 2009

In December 2008, he was awarded the Knights Commander Grand Cross of the Royal Order Kingdom of Poland. Kan was appointed a High Member of the Royal Council in 2009.

In the 2009 Honours List of the Hong Kong SAR Government, Kan was awarded the Silver Bauhinia Star. He was also appointed a JP by the Hong Kong SAR Government in 2006.

Kan was appointed as Honorary Consul of the Republic of Hungary in the Hong Kong SAR and the Macau SAR in January 2011.

== Personal life ==
Kan is married to the sister of actor Natalis Chan. He enjoys antique collecting. His sister Mary Kan Ma-lai is a barrister. His estranged brother Michael Kan Chi-ho, a struck-off solicitor, fled Hong Kong in 1994 and is the subject of an Interpol red notice.
