= Neva Haites =

Australian geneticist

- Born: Brisbane, Australia
- Awards: FRSE (2010); FMedSci (2000); OBE (2006)
- Scientific career
- Fields: Genetics and Cancer
- Institutions: University of Aberdeen

Neva Haites is an Australian scientist and physician who investigates molecular genetics and diseases in humans and specialises in cancer genetics; she has more than 90 publications in genetics concerning inherited predisposition to cancer, retinitis pigmentosa, hereditary motor neuropathy and sensory neuropathy.

== Career ==
Haites is a professor of medical genetics and the Head of College at the University of Aberdeen, College of Life Sciences and Medicine. In 2004, she was appointed as Vice Principal of the University of Aberdeen, making her the first woman to hold that position. She is also a member of the Human Fertilisation and Embryology Authority (HFEA), a Government Advisory Committee member of the Committee on Medical Aspects of Radiation in the Environment (COMARE), and a Biomedical and Therapeutic Committee member of the Chief Scientist Office (CSO) of the Scottish Office.

Haites was awarded an Order of the British Empire (OBE) for services to Medicine during the 2006 New Year Honours, elected Fellow of the Academy of Medical Sciences (FMedSci) in 2000, elected Fellow of the Royal Society of Edinburgh (FRSE) in 2010, and has gained fellowships with the Royal College of Physicians (FRCP) and the Royal College of Pathologists (FRCP).

Haites is Vice-President for Life Sciences of the Royal Society of Edinburgh.

== Personal ==
Although residing in Scotland, Haites was born in Brisbane, Australia.
