= Robin McInnes =

Professor Robin McInnes OBE (born 1 October 1949) is a chartered geologist and chartered civil engineer who is an authority on coastal management and ground instability problems; he lives and works on the Isle of Wight, UK. He is a visiting professor at the Department of Geography & Environment, University of Southampton. He is also a Fellow of the Institution of Civil Engineers, the Geological Society of London, the Royal Geographical Society and the Royal Society of Arts.

== Career ==
McInnes read Geology BSc (Hons) at the University of Southampton (1968–1971) and completed a PhD in Integrated Coastal Zone Management at the University of Portsmouth in 2004. After working for local authorities in Hampshire and the Isle of Wight for thirty-five years (1972–2007) he established his own consultancy 'Coastal & Geotechnical Services' in 2007.

McInnes has advised the United Nations, the Council of Europe and the European Commission (DGs Environment and Research) on issues relating to coastal management and natural hazards. He has developed and led successfully thirteen European Union projects; funded by LIFE Environment, Interreg and the VIth and VIIth Framework Programmes.

In December 2007, he was awarded the Crown Estate- Caird (National Maritime Museum) Research Fellowship. From 1995 to 2009, Professor McInnes was Technical Chairman of the Standing Conference of Problems with the Coastline (SCOPAC) and chaired the Coastal Groups of England and Wales from 1997 to 2009. In 2006, he was appointed OBE for Services to Flood and Coastal Defence.

McInnes has a particular interest in coastal risk management and landslide management and has written numerous technical papers, as well as non-technical guidance on coastal and geotechnical issues. He arranged an International Conference on Slope Stability on the Isle of Wight in 1991, which was co-sponsored by the Institution of Civil Engineers. He was Chairman of the Organising Committee for the International Conference on Instability – Planning and Management held at Ventnor, Isle of Wight in May 2002 and was Chairman of the Organising Committees for the Institution of Civil Engineers' International Coastal Management Conferences in 2003 and 2007. In 2007 he also chaired the Organising Committee for the International Conference on 'Climate Change and Landslides' held at Ventnor in May 2007.

Since 2008, McInnes has undertaken a range of research projects for The Crown Estate and Historic England, the Environment Agency and Natural England that have bridged the disciplines of art and science by examining how historical images (paintings, prints, and old photographs) dating back to the late eighteenth century can improve the understanding and management of risks to coasts, coastal heritage, coastal heritage sites and natural environments.

McInnes has particular interest in both British landscape and maritime art, and the history and art of the Isle of Wight, subjects on which he has written a number of books and made numerous illustrated presentations. He has written articles for Country Life, The Antiques Collector, and Island Life, he is a regular writer for Style of Wight magazine.

== Bibliography ==
=== Books ===
==== Technical publications ====
1. McInnes, R., Tomalin, D. & Jakeways, J., 2000. LIFE-Environment Project: LIFE – 97 ENV/UK/000510 1997–2000 Coastal Change, Climate and Instability: Final Technical Report. Isle of Wight Council, Isle of Wight, UK.
2. McInnes, R.G. and Jakeways, J. (eds.). 2002. 'Proceedings of the International Conference on Instability – Planning and Management', Ventnor, Isle of Wight, Thomas Telford.
3. McInnes, R. (Ed.). 2003. 'Proceedings of the International Conference on Coastal Management'. Institution of Civil Engineers. Brighton. Thomas Telford.
4. McInnes, R. G.; Jakeways, J. & Fairbank, H. 2006. "Response – Responding to the Risks" from Climate Change on the Coast. Final report of the EU LIFE Environment study. Ventnor, Isle of Wight.
5. McInnes, R.G. 2006. 'Responding to the Risks from Climate Change in Coastal Zones; A Good Practice Guide', Isle of Wight Centre for the Coastal Environment, Ventnor, Isle of Wight.
6. McInnes, R.G., Jakeways, J., Fairbank, H. and Mathie, E. (eds.). 2007. 'Proceedings of the International Conference on Landslides and Climate Change – Challenges and Solutions', Ventnor, Isle of Wight, Taylor and Francis.
7. McInnes, R. G. (Ed.), 2007. Proceedings of the Institution of Civil Engineers International Coastal Management Conference, Cardiff. Thomas Telford.
8. McInnes, R.G. 2007. 'The Undercliff of the Isle of Wight – A Guide to Managing Instability', Isle of Wight Centre for the Coastal Environment, Ventnor, 69pps.
9. McInnes, R.G. 2009. 'A Non-technical Guide to Coastal Risk Management', Report for SCOPAC, 86pps.
10. McInnes, R. & Stubbings, H., 2010. 'Art as a Tool to Support Understanding of Coastal Change in East Anglia'. The Crown Estate. London. ISBN 978-1-906410-10-0.
11. McInnes, R. & Stubbings, H., 2011. 'A Coastal Historical Resources Guide for England'. The Crown Estate. ISBN 978 1 906410 19 3.
12. McInnes, R.G., Cope, S.N., Moore, R., Bradbury, A.P and Millerchip, C.J. 2011. 'Adapting to Coastal Change Along England's Southern Shorelines' (ACCESS). Report for SCOPAC. 64pps.
13. McInnes, R.G. and Moore, R. 2011. 'Cliff Instability and Erosion Management in Great Britain – A Good Practice Guide'. Halcrow. 88pps.
14. McInnes, R.G. and Benstead, S., 2013. 'Art as a Tool to Support Understanding of Coastal Change in Wales'. The Crown Estate. London. ISBN 978-1-906410-42-1.
15. McInnes, R. G. and Benstead, S., 2013. 'Art as a Tool to Support Understanding of Coastal Change in Scotland'. The Crown Estate. London. ISBN 978-1-906410-49-0.
16. McInnes, R.G. and Moore, R. 2014. 'Living with Ground Instability – An International Good Practice Guide'. CH2MHILL. 80pps.
17. McInnes, R. & Benstead, S., 2015 'Art and Coastal Change in Northern Ireland'. The Crown Estate. London. ISBN 978-1-906410-54-4.
18. McInnes, R.G. 2016. 'CHERISH – Coastal Heritage Risk – Imagery in Support of Heritage Management in South-West England'. Report No. 7145 for Historic England. 265pps.
19. McInnes, R.G. 2016. 'Historic Watercourses – Using Imagery to Support Identification of the Historic Character of Watercourses' A Case Study on the Dorset Stour. Report for Historic England,111pps. Project No. 7244.
20. McInnes, R.G. and Stanford-Clark, C. 2019. 'The State of the British Coast- Observable Changes Through Art Imagery 1770–Present Day'. Coastal and Geotechnical Services. 442pps.
21. McInnes, R.G. 2019. 'The Most Painted Place- Bonchurch and the Isle of Wight School of Artists'. Report for the 'Down to the Coast' Heritage Lottery Fund Project.
22. Moore, R. and McInnes, R.G. 2021. 'Coastal Erosion and Climate Change – Guidelines for Policymakers, Planners and Stakeholders'. Report for Jacobs. 86pps.
23. McInnes, R.G. and Stanford-Clark, C. 2021. 'Art in Support of Improved Understanding of the Changing Character of Exmoor National Park'. Report for The Exmoor Society. 126pps.
24. McInnes, R.G. 2022. 'Assessment of the Potential Impacts of Development on Land Stability at Fairlight Cove Coastal Zone, East Sussex'. Report for Rother District Council. 52pps.
25. McInnes, R.G. and Stanford-Clark, C. 2022. 'Landscape Art in Support of River Management in England'. Report for the Environment Agency. 251pps.
26. McInnes, R.G. and Stanford-Clark, C. 2023. 'Art in Support of Improved Understanding of Changing Coastal Environments'. Report for Natural England. 261pps.

==== Art and local history publications ====
1. McInnes, R. G. 1974 'The Isle of Wight'. Collins. London. ISBN 0 00 435738 8.
2. McInnes, R.G. 1982. 'Walks for Motorists on the Isle of Wight'. Frederick Warne. London. ISBN 0-7232-2805-1.
3. McInnes, R.G and Butler, A. 1985. 'The Undercliff of the isle of Wight in Old Picture Postcards'. The European Library. Netherlands. ISBN 90-288-3030-8/CIP.
4. McInnes, R.G and Butler, A. 1986. 'Shanklin in Old Picture Postcards'. The European Library. Netherlands. ISBN 90-288-3366-8/CIP.
5. McInnes, R. G., 1989. 'The Isle of Wight Illustrated'. Cross Publishing. Chale, IW. ISBN 0-9509739-5-5.
6. McInnes, R. G., 1999. 'The Garden Isle – Landscape Paintings of the Isle of Wight'.Cross Publishing. Chale, IW. ISBN 0-9509739-71.
7. McInnes, R. G., 1993.'A Picturesque Tour of the Isle of Wight'. Cross Publishing. Chale, IW. ISBN 1-873295-15-4.
8. Drummond, M and McInnes, R.G. (Eds). 2001. 'The Book of the Solent'. Cross Publishing. Chale, IW. ISBN 0-901281-30-1.
9. McInnes, R.G. 2002. 'Brannon's Vectis Scenery – A Facsimile of the 1865 Edition'. Cross Publishing. Chale. IW.
10. McInnes, R. G., 2004. 'Fifty Years Along the Undercliff of the Isle of Wight'. Cross Publishing. Chale, IW. ISBN 1873295-66-9.
11. McInnes, R.G. 2006. 'The Book of the Isle of Wight Coast'. Cross Publishing. Chale, IW. ISBN 1-873295-91-X.
12. McInnes, R.G. 'Art, Architecture and the Island Landscape'. Cross Publishing. Chale, IW. ISBN 978-1-873295-18-2.
13. McInnes, R.G. 2008. 'Romantic and Picturesque Scenery of the Isle of Wight – The Journal of a Gentleman'. Cross Publishing. Chale, IW. ISBN 978-1-873295-10-6.
14. McInnes, R.G. 2010. 'Landscape Paintings of the Isle of Wight – 25 Years of Art Exhibitions'. Cross Publishing. Chale, IW. ISBN 978-1-873295-27-4.
15. McInnes, R.G. 2014. 'British Coastal Art 1770–1930'. Cross Publishing. Chale, IW. ISBN 978-1-873295-46-5.
16. McInnes, R.G. 2016. 'Isle of Wight Landscape Art – An Illustrated Dictionary 1650–1930'. Cross Publishing. Chale, IW. ISBN 978-1-873295-62-5.
17. McInnes, R.G. 2016. 'Vistas and Panoramas of the East Wight Landscape'. Report for the 'Down to the Coast' Heritage Lottery Fund Project. www.downtothecoast.co.uk.
18. Springman, A and McInnes, R.G. 2017. 'Shanklin Chine – Its History, Environment and Culture'. Cross Publishing. Chale, IW. ISBN 978-1-873295-63-2.
19. McInnes, R.G. 2017. 'Fine Mansions and Fair Villas of the East Wight'. Report for the 'Down to the Coast' Heritage Lottery Fund Project. www.downtothecoast.co.uk.
20. McInnes, R.G. 2018. 'Paradise Lost – The Lost Architectural Heritage of the East Wight'. Report for the 'Down to the Coast' Heritage Lottery Fund Project. www.downtothecoast.co.uk.
21. McInnes, R.G. 2020. 'Furthest South – From the Scottish Borders to the Isle of Wight'. Cross Publishing. ISBN 978-1-5272-7079-4.

=== Critical reviews of McInnes's works ===
- Daily Telegraph. 21/01/1995. 'Cliff dwellers give danger the slip'.
- Isle of Wight County Press. 28/07/2006. Wright, R. 'The Book of the Isle of Wight Coast -More than just a fine cover'.
- Isle of Wight County Press. 17/08/2007. Wright, R. 'How we built the Island'. Review of 'Art, Architecture and the Island Landscape'.
- Daily Telegraph. 01/08/2008. 'Art and the True Picture of Britain's Lost Coastline'.
- European Commission DG Environment. 2012. 'Life and Coastal Management'. Report on the EU LIFE 'RESPONSE' project .pps.54/55.
- Country Life Magazine. 10/09/2014. Mallalieu, H. 'British Coastal Art'. Books. 208 (37): 140.
- Isle of Wight County Press. 16/09/2016. Wright, R. 'Why artists return to the Isle of Wight's Landscape'.
- Style of Wight Magazine. July/August 2017. 'A Coastal Champion'. pps 20–24.
