= Julie Bradshaw =

British marathon swimmer

Julie Bradshaw is a British teacher, sports coach, counsellor, long-distance swimmer, and councillor at Charnwood Borough Council, Loughborough.

== Early life and career ==
Born in Blackpool, England, she first swam the English Channel at the age of 15. On 5 August 2002, she did it again using the butterfly stroke, completing the swim in 14 hours, 18 minutes, and breaking the previous world record by over nine hours. In 2006, she was awarded an MBE for Services to Swimming and Charity, and Loughborough University awarded her an honorary doctorate.

Her other swims include a butterfly swim around Manhattan (28.5 miles) in July 2011 in 9 hours and 28 mins. The longest swim that Bradshaw has completed was a four-way Windermere swim (42 miles) in just over 21 hours; she was the first woman to achieve this in 1981.

Bradshaw served on the Channel Swimming Association (CSA) as secretary for over 10 years until she resigned in November 2016. Whilst the Board invited her to continue her role as a director, Bradshaw turned it down and in May 2018, she took the CSA to court for non payment of her wages where she was successful at Blackpool County Court on 21 September 2018. The Channel Swimming Association was ordered to pay her wages and costs.

The Channel Swimming Association in retaliation took legal action against her and her company accusing them of retention of company documents and a badge in the Central London County Court; she and the company were ordered on 21 July 2020 to return documents and badge and pay costs.
