= William McKee (health administrator) =

William McKee, CBE (1952–2018) was a former and founding chief executive of the Belfast Health and Social Care Trust. In 2007 he led the merger of six Trusts to form the Belfast Trust one of the largest in the UK employing 20,000 people with an annual budget of £1 billion. He was a consultant in health and social care strategy and policy and continues to undertake consultancy assignments in the UK and Ireland.

He was born in Belfast, the son of the Margaret and James McKee of Bangor, County Down, Northern Ireland. He received a BSc from Queen's University Belfast and an MBA from the University of Ulster. In 2006, McKee was appointed Commander of the Order of the British Empire (CBE) for service to the NHS in Northern Ireland. He was survived by his wife Ursula and two children, Catherine and William.

William McKee was previously chief executive of the Royal Hospitals comprising the Royal Victoria, Royal Maternity, and Royal Belfast Hospital for Sick Children from 1993 to 2006
