= Stephen Moss (nurse) =

British nurse

Sir Stephen Alan Moss (born 1947) is a British nurse.

He was knighted in the 2006 New Year Honours at the end of a long career in nursing, when he retired from his role of Chief Executive of the Queen's Medical Centre in Nottingham. Born in Cannock, Staffordshire in 1947.
