= Fendersmith =

Profession to clean and repair metal fenders

A Fendersmith is a person employed to clean and repair the metal fenders before fireplaces in mansions, fine estates, or castles. The person is usually also responsible for lighting and keeping the fire contained within the fireplace.

Few fendersmiths exist today, but can be found in places like Windsor Castle and Buckingham Palace.

A few bagpipe tunes exist with titles relating to fendersmiths such as A Salute to Willie the Royal Fendersmith. It has been said that this was "Written by P.M James Banks as a tribute to Willie, the elder brother of James and Alex Banks". Another tune A Salute to the Royal Fendersmith was played at the end of the committal of the late Queen Elizabeth II.
