= Sylvia Denton =

British nurse (1941-2020)

Sylvia Denton CBE FRCN
- Born: 1941
- Died: 2020 (aged 78–79)
- Known for: Royal College of Nursing President 2002-2006

Sylvia Ernestine Denton (1941-2020), CBE, FRCN. RHV. Denton was one of the first breast care nurses in the United Kingdom and President of the Royal College of Nursing from 2002-2006.

== Education and early career ==
Denton began her nursing career with a qualification in general nursing from the Royal London Hospital, registering in 1963. She practised in the area of thoracic medicine, becoming a research sister and clinical nurse specialist.

Denton also qualified and practised as a specialist health visitor for homeless families, she also helped found the Royal College of Nursing Breast Care Nursing Society. Her master's degree was in advanced clinical practice in cancer nursing. As of 2007 she was Lead Nurse/Senior Clinical Nurse Specialist in breast care at Barts and The London NHS Trust.

== Honours ==
Denton was made a Fellow of the Royal College of Nursing in 1990, then in 1996 she received an OBE for services to nursing. She served on RCN Council from 1998 to 2002 as Deputy President, before being elected President of the RCN in October 2002, serving in that office until October 2006. Denton was a president of Europa Donna UK and served on its board. Europa Donna was a pan-European organisation which campaigns on issues for women with breast cancer.

At national level, Denton served on a number of committees including the Council of the Breast Care Mastectomy Association and the Medical Advisory Committee of the Women’s National Cancer Control Campaign. She was the only nurse on the Government’s Advisory Committee on Breast Cancer Screening. During this time she was part of the working group chaired by Professor Sir Patrick Forrest, which developed the Breast Cancer Screening: Report to the Health Ministers of England, Wales, Scotland and Northern Ireland (November 1986). Denton pushed for the full implementation of this report. In 2003 Denton was elected as a member of the Steering Group of the European Forum for Nursing and Midwifery Associations, and was a member of the Department of Health's Standing Nursing and Midwifery Advisory Committee from 1998. Denton also chaired the editorial board of the Cancer Nursing Practice journal.

== Death ==
Denton died on 19 October 2020.

== Publications ==
Denton S, Haffenden, S. Caring in the comfort of home: a guide for carers (Caretrust Publications, Portland, Oregon 2008)

Denton S (ed). Breast cancer nursing (Chapman and Hall, London 1996)

Denton, S (1987). A Lot of Living to Do. Nursing Times, vol. 83, no. 19, pp. 6+.

Denton, S (2007). Reinforcing our political clout. Cancer Nursing Practice, 6(4), pp. 3.

Denton, S (2000). It's what we do next that counts. Nursing Standard, 14(29), pp. 12–3.
