= List of lingerie brands =

This is a list of notable lingerie brands and their country of manufacture. It catalogues brands known primarily for their lingerie or underwear, not fashion or clothing in general.

Brand	Year of establishment	Country of origin	Country of manufacture
Alanic	2011	United States	United States
Adore Me	2011	US	Vietnam/Sri Lanka
Aerie	2006	US	India
Agent Provocateur	1994	UK	China
Andrés Sardá	1980	Spain	Spain/China
Ann Summers	1970	UK	China
Anna Sui Lingerie	2014	Korea	China
Baci Lingerie	2010	US	China
Bali	1927	US	Honduras/Dominican Republic
Berlei	2005	Australia	Indonesia
Bluebella	2005	UK	Unknown
Boutique La Vie en Rose	1984	Canada	India/China
Boux Avenue	2011	UK	Turkey/China
Bravissimo	1995	UK	Romania
Bruno Banani	1993	Germany	Estonia
Cake Maternity	2008	Australia	China
Chantelle	1876	France	France
Coco de Mer	2001	UK	Portugal
Figleaves	1998	UK	Unknown
Formfit	1917 ceased 1997	US	Unknown
Frederick's of Hollywood	1947	US	US/China
Gilly Hicks	2008	US	Unknown
Harlette	2005	United Kingdom	Australia/France/UK
Hanro	1884	Switzerland	Austria/Hungary/Portugal
Hunkemöller	1886	Netherlands	China
Intimissimi	1996	Italy	Sri Lanka
Iris Lingerie	1929 ceased 1970	US	US
Jockey	1876	US	US
Jolidon	1993	Romania	Romania
Kestos	1925 ceased 1985	UK	UK
Kiss Me Deadly	2006	UK	Unknown
La Perla	1954	Italy	Italy/China
La Senza	1990 ceased 2017	Canada	Unknown
Lembrassa	2008 ceased 2017	UK	China
Lily of France	1915	US	Unknown
Lisca	1955	Slovenia	Slovenia
Lise Charmel	1950s	France	France
Lounge (company)	2015	UK	Unknown
Maidenform	1922	US	US
Marlies Dekkers	1993	NL	Unknown
Nichole de Carle	2009	UK	UK
Olga	1941	US	Paraguay
Peach John	1994	Japan	China
Playtex	1947	US	Unknown
Pretty Polly	1919	UK	Unknown
Rigby & Peller	1939	UK	Thailand
Savage X Fenty	2018	US	Unknown
Schiesser	1875	Germany	Unknown
Silhouette	1887	UK	Unknown
Spanx	2000	US	Thailand
ThirdLove	2013	US	China
Trashy Lingerie	1973	US	US
Triumph International	1886	Germany	Brazil/China/Thailand
True & Co.	2012	US	China
Ultimo	1999 ceased 2015	UK	India
Van de Velde N.V.	1919	Belgium	China
Vanity Fair	1919	US	US, Honduras
Vassarette	1958	US	Vietnam
Vedette Shapewear	1983	US	Unknown
Victoria's Secret	1977	US	China
Wacoal	1946	Japan	China
What Katie Did	1999	UK	India
Wolford	1949	Austria	Croatia
Wonderbra	1939	Canada	Indonesia, China
Yandy	2007	US	US, China
Zimmerli of Switzerland	1871	Switzerland	Switzerland

== See also ==
- List of fashion designers
- List of sock manufacturers
- List of swimwear brands
