= S. sarda =

S. sarda may refer to:

- Sarda sarda, the Atlantic bonito, a fish species
- Splendrillia sarda, a sea snail species
- Sylvia sarda, the Marmora's warbler, a bird species found on Mediterranean islands, typically including Corsica and Sardinia

== See also ==
- Sarda (disambiguation)
