= Icebreaker (clothing) =

New Zealand merino wool clothing company

icebreaker
- Type: Public
- Industry: Clothing manufacture
- Founded: 1995; 31 years ago, in Wellington, New Zealand
- Founder: Jeremy Moon
- Headquarters: Auckland, New Zealand
- Key people: Jan Van Mossevelde (CEO)
- Products: Base layers, Tops, T-shirts, Sweaters, Knitwear, Hoodies, Jackets, Socks, Underwear, Accessories
- Number of employees: 400 (globally)
- Website: www.icebreaker.com

icebreaker is a merino wool outdoor and natural performance outdoor clothing brand headquartered in Auckland, New Zealand. It was purchased by VF Corporation, a NYSE listed entity in 2018. icebreaker was conceived and designed around the philosophy of sustainability, using natural fibres, environmental and social ethics, and animal welfare. The company began by specialising in the creation of merino base layers and now offers underwear, mid layers, outer wear, socks and accessories based on natural fibres.

icebreaker was founded in 1995 by Jeremy Moon, and now supplies its clothing to more than 4,700 stores in 50 countries.

== History ==
icebreaker started when, in 1994, an American girlfriend introduced Jeremy Moon, then 24, to a merino wool farmer she had stayed with as she backpacked around New Zealand. Brian and Fiona Brakenridge lived on the remote Pohuenui Island in Marlborough with their two sons Ben and Sam and 5,000 sheep. They had developed some prototype thermal underwear made from 100% pure New Zealand merino wool, a fibre that was then of such little value that it was sold at low cost to be blended with traditional wool.

icebreaker began selling its products in New Zealand, followed by Australia. The company has been growing in Europe and acquiring its distributors there. In 2010, one in every three icebreaker garments was sold in Europe, now one of icebreaker's largest markets. In 2010 company sales were approximately $100 million. In 2014 company sales were approximately $200 million.

The company's first United States headquarters were in Santa Barbara, California and then in Sun Valley, Idaho. It moved offices to Portland, Oregon in 2007 and, in December 2008 combined its U.S. sales and marketing office with its global design studio at a new headquarters at 1330 NW 14th Avenue in Portland, which was Gold certified by the Leadership in Energy and Environmental Design (LEED) green building rating system established by the U.S. Green Building Council.

icebreaker sells through wholesale channels, retail stores, and its website. It opened its first retail store at the Wellington International Airport in 2005. In 2007, icebreaker opened its first overseas TouchLab retail stores in Montreal, Quebec, Canada, and Portland, Oregon, USA. In 2010, icebreaker opened its first store in Auckland and its first independent store in Europe, in collaboration with Travel Store SARL as retail partner, at 21st Avenue Michel Croz, Chamonix, Mont-Blanc, France. The company opened its first store in the SoHo neighbourhood of New York City in November 2010, to be followed by continued retail expansion.

icebreaker has been the subject of two case studies by Harvard Business School. In 2009, The New Zealand Herald named icebreaker's Moon one of the country's top business leaders.

icebreaker has moved its manufacturing from New Zealand to China. It commenced trials to move production to China in 2003 and delivered first product from offshore manufacture in early 2004. icebreaker then used a phased approach over the following 2–3 years to ensure impact on NZ manufacturing was minimal. Socks are all manufactured in the USA.

After having been on the company's board since July 2012, former Air New Zealand CEO Rob Fyfe started as its executive chairman in September 2013.

VF agreed to purchase icebreaker in 2017.

In November 2017, icebreaker signed a $100 million supply contract with New Zealand merino farmers.

== Products ==
icebreaker has developed a merino fibre layering system in multiple weights including: 120 g/m^{2} Featherweight, 150 g/m^{2} Ultralite, 200 g/m^{2} Lightweight, 260 g/m^{2} Midweight, 320 g/m^{2} Midlayer and 380 g/m^{2} Outerlayer. icebreaker products can be worn solo or layered. Collections include Superfine Lightweight Travel for warm to hot conditions and all season wear; City Lightweight Urban Wear; icebreaker GT stand alone and insulation layers for active sports such as skiing and snowboarding; icebreaker GT Running, Road Cycling and Mountain biking lines with Lycra; Bodyfit Active Base Layers for outdoor sports; wind resistant Outer Layers; and underwear for men and women. The company also makes socks and accessories including headwear, gloves and neckwear. It also has a kids collection. In the Autumn of 2010, icebreaker introduced Realfleece, which unlike synthetic fleece, is made of merino.

== Fibre sourcing and manufacturing ==
icebreaker was conceived and designed around the philosophy of sustainability, using natural fibres, environmental and social ethics, and animal welfare.

In August 2008 it launched icebreaker Baacode, a system that allowed consumers to trace the origins of their icebreaker right to a sheep station (sheep farm) in the Southern Alps of New Zealand, where the merino fibre was grown. icebreaker merino fabric is certified to Oeko-tex standard 100 Class 1 and icebreaker factories meet ISO 14001 environmental standards.

icebreaker pioneered long-term contracts that pay a significant price premium to selected New Zealand sheep farmers and allow them to carry out long-term planning. In return, contracted growers agree to meet icebreaker's strict conditions on environmental and social issues, and on animal welfare. icebreaker is now supplied with merino fibre by 140 high country stations, which cover more than 2 million acres (810,000ha) of New Zealand countryside. In June 2008, icebreaker signed the biggest wool contract ever in New Zealand, worth approximately US$50 million.

The company prohibits the practice of mulesing, which includes the traditional surgical method and the clips method. Mulesing removes strips of skin around the tail to prevent the fly-strike disease, Myiasis. In order to avoid mulesing, sheep that produce icebreaker merino may be treated through medicines and chemicals for the disease.

== See also ==
- List of mountaineering equipment brands
- List of outdoor industry parent companies
- AS Colour
- Kathmandu
- List of lingerie brands
