= Hourglass Angel =

American apparel company

Hourglass Angel, LLC
- Industry: Apparel
- Founded: 2008
- Founder: Ruben Soto
- Headquarters: Chicago, Illinois, United States
- Area served: Worldwide
- Key people: Ruben Soto (CEO)
- Products: Waist trainers; shapewear; corsets; undergarments
- Website: www.hourglassangel.com

Hourglass Angel is an American apparel company producing and selling waist trainers, shapewear, corsets, and other undergarments by several brands, including its own private label. It was founded by Ruben Soto in 2008 and is headquartered in Illinois. In 2016 Hourglass Angel was one of the 5,000 fastest growing companies in America, and Soto was included in Forbes 30 Under 30.

== History ==
As a student at the University of Michigan, Ruben Soto worked for his father at his clothing wholesaling business in Chicago's Little Village that catered mostly to Latinas. Noticing that clients were looking for shapewear that was stronger and more durable, Soto launched Hourglass Angel as an e-commerce site during his junior year. At first, he focused mostly on waist cinchers called fajas, which means "wraps" in Spanish. Fajas, which used to be imported from Colombia, were originally used by new mothers to regain their figures immediately and by recovering liposuction or Caesarean section patients to prevent swelling.

As one of the fastest-growing businesses in the country, the company grew nearly 900 percent in the period 2009–2012, hitting $3.2 million in revenue in 2012. In 2013, Hourglass Angel employed 10 people and was selling body shapers and control garments from more than 150 brands.

Jessica Alba stated in 2013 that she used corsets to regain her post-baby figure. In the same year, sales of company's top three waist trainers were up 250%. In 2014, Kim Kardashian endorsed waist training on Instagram. She was followed by her sisters and other celebrities, who started wearing corsets and posting their selfies online. Soto's revenues in 2014 were over $8 million.

As of 2016, Hourglass Angel was included in Inc. magazine's rankings of the 5,000 fastest-growing companies in America. Soto was included in Forbes 30 Under 30.

== Products ==
Hourglass Angel sells corsets with hook-and-eye enclosures and steel stays, or boning. It also offers waist cinchers made of latex. The company also offers products that are less intense than corsets: exercise leggings that purport to battle cellulite, "butt-lifting" jeans and "slimming" support tank tops for men.

Soto launched a house brand called Amia in 2013 and Hourglass Angel in 2018. Other brands sold by Hourglass Angel include Bali, Ann Michell, Carnival, Co’coon, Lytess, Overbra, Sassybax, Slim Me, Squeem, Vedette, and Yummie Tummie. The company's most popular products are the waist trainers and the waist cinchers. The Amia waist cincher promises "an instant 1-4 inch reduction in your waistline."
