= History of cleavage =

Aspect of women's cultural history

Thousands of years of history provide evidence of the differing fashions, cultural norms, and artistic depictions regarding cleavage and clothes that accentuate or flaunt cleavage. From the absolute modesty of the 16th century, to the Merveilleuses Directoire dresses with their transparency, the décolleté has followed the times and is much more than a simple fashion effect.

A décolleté is the part of the throat that is exposed, but also the cut of a bodice that exposes the neck, the shoulders, and sometimes the chest.

During Antiquity, several symbols clashed: the freedom of the non-erotic body (Egypt or Crete) clashed with modesty and reserve (Greco-Roman society). The fashion of the Roman tunic will influence Merovingian and Carolingian fashion.

== Antiquity ==
=== 3rd millennium BC ===
Ancient cleavage

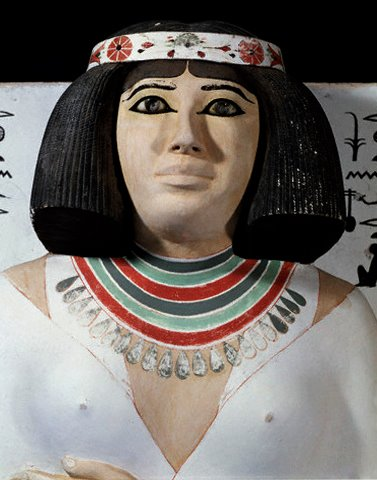
Princess Nofret (27th century BC) of the Fourth Dynasty of Egypt

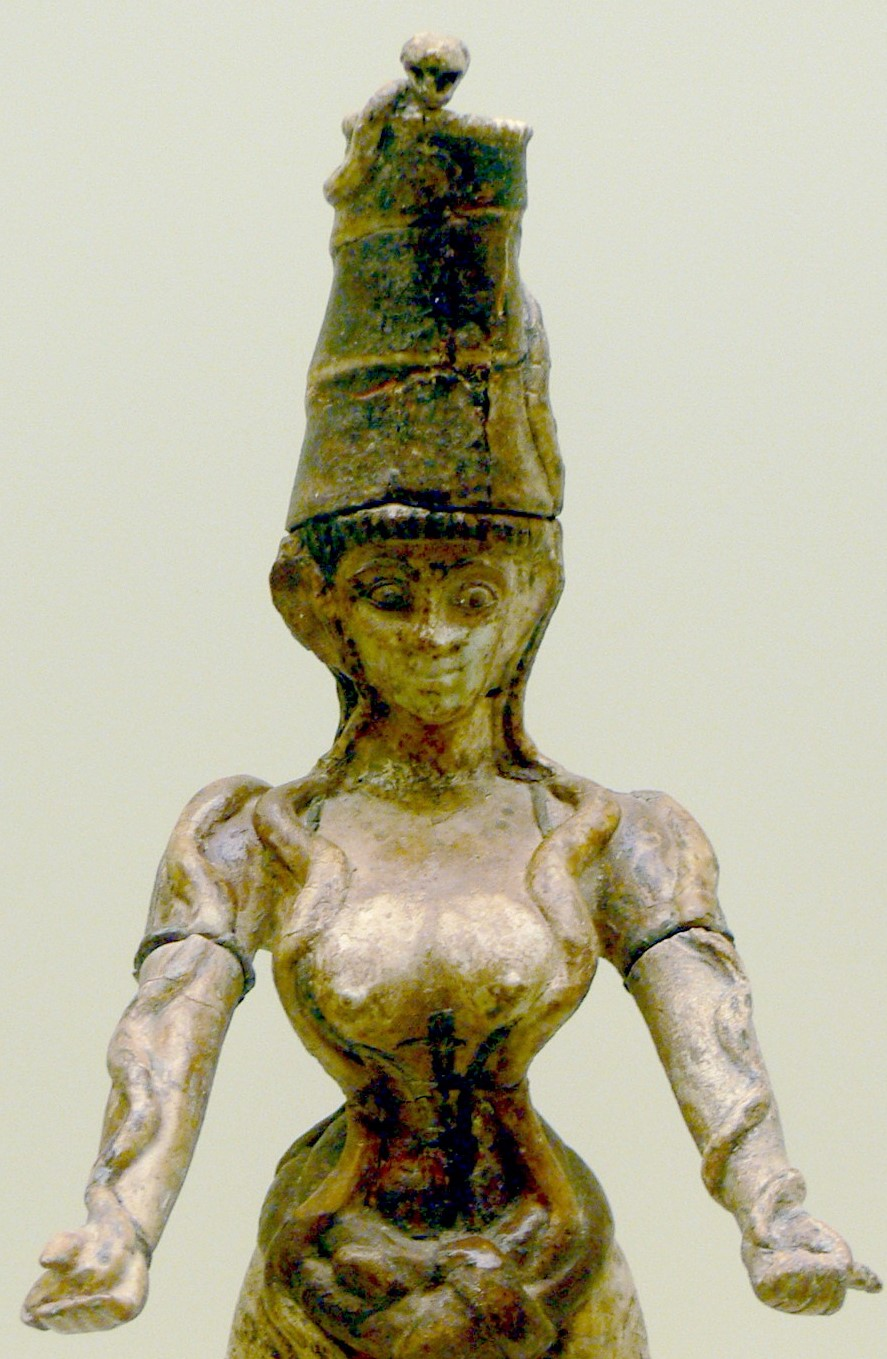
Minoan snake goddess (17th century BC)

In 2600 BC, princess Nofret of the Fourth Dynasty of Egypt was depicted wearing a V-neck gown with a plunging neckline that exposed ample cleavage that was further emphasized by an elaborate necklace and prominently protruding nipples.

=== 2nd millennium BC ===
In ancient Minoan culture, women wore clothes that complemented slim waists and full breasts. One of the better-known features of ancient Minoan fashion is breast exposure; women wore tops that could be arranged to completely cover or expose their breasts, with bodices to accentuate their cleavage. In 1600 BC, snake goddess figurines with open dress-fronts revealing entire breasts, were sculpted in Minos. By that time, Cretan women in Knossos were wearing ornamental fitted bodices with open cleavage, sometimes with a peplum. Another set of Minoan figurines from 1500 BC show women in bare-bosomed corsets.

Ancient Greek women adorned their cleavage with a long pendant necklace called a kathema. The ancient Greek goddess Hera is described in the Iliad to have worn something like an early version of a push-up bra festooned with "brooches of gold" and "a hundred tassels" to increase her cleavage to divert Zeus from the Trojan War. Women in Greek and Roman civilizations had at times used breastbands like taenia in Rome to enhance smaller busts, but more often, women of the masculine Greco-Roman world, where unisex clothes were often preferred, used breastbands like apodesmes in Greece, and fascia or mamillare in Rome to suppress their breasts. Among these mamillare was a particularly strict leather corset for suppressing women with big busts.

=== 1st millennium BC ===
Wearing a garment to support the breasts may date back to ancient Greece. Women wore an apodesmos, later stēthodesmē, mastodesmos and mastodeton, all meaning "breast-band", which was a band of wool or linen that was wrapped across the breasts and tied or pinned at the back. Roman women wore breast-bands during sport, such as those shown on the Coronation of the Winner mosaic (also known as the "Bikini mosaic").

Rabbi Aha b. Raba (circa 5th century) and Nathan the Babylonian (circa 2nd century) measured the appropriate size of the cleavage as "of one hand-breadth between a woman's breasts". This was not cleavage shown, but rather, cleavage larger than a hand-breadth was considered to be a birth defect. Tzniut prohibits any cleavage from showing. In The Golden Ass, the only Roman novel to survive in its entirety, Photis, a major female character, is described as sporting significant cleavage and perfumed nipples.

== Medieval ==
=== 4th-5th centuries ===
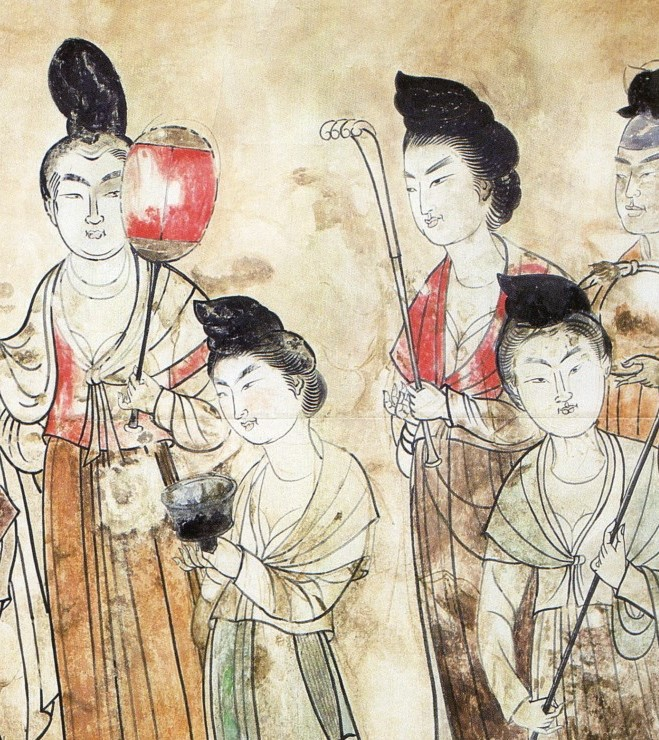
Courtiers in China during Tang dynasty (circa 706), when the décolletage was quite liberal. 2014 Chinese TV series The Empress of China was briefly pulled off-air for showing the abundance of cleavage in Tang courts.

According to Islamic exegesis, women of pre-Islamic jahiliyyah (ignorance) era often wore clothes that exposed their neck, shoulders and upper part of their bosoms to draw attention to their beauty. Imru' al-Qais, the most well known of pre-Islamic Arab poets, wrote in Mu'allaqat, a set of seven poems, "Their vests openings are wide above their delicate breasts" and "her breast as smooth and shining as mirrors" (translation by Paul Smith, The seven Golden Odes of Arabia; the Mu'allaqat, New Humanity Books, 2008).

=== 7th-9th centuries ===
During the Tang dynasty (7th to 9th centuries), women in China were increasingly freer than before, and by the mid-Tang, their décolleté dresses became quite liberated. The Tang women inherited the traditional ruqun gown and modified it by opening up the collar to expose their cleavage, which had previously been unimaginable. Rather than the conservative garments worn by earlier Chinese women, women of the Tang era deliberately emphasized their cleavage. The popular style of the era was long gowns of soft fabrics that were cut with a pronounced décolletage and very wide sleeves, or a décolleté knee-length gown that was worn over a skirt. Chinese clothes from the period had a profound influence on the Japanese kimono.

=== 10th-11th centuries ===
Between the 11th and 16th centuries, the prevailing décolleté clothes of women of Punjab, Gujarat and Rajasthan in India were replaced with covered bosoms and long veils as the region increasingly came under foreign control. During this period, elaborate, opulent courtly dresses with wide décolletage became popular in the Italian maritime states Venice, Genoa and Florence. After the Black Death, women started taking more liberty in clothing, including drawing attention to the breasts.

=== 12th-13th centuries ===
Until the 13th century, visible cleavage was still not acceptable in the Christian West. Beginning in France, a change in attitude started to appear by the 14th century, when necklines were lowered, clothes were tightened, and breasts were once again flaunted. Décolleté gowns were introduced in the 15th century. In a breast-rating system that was invented at the time, the highest rating was given to breasts that were "small, white, round like apples, hard, firm, and wide apart".

Women started squeezing the breasts and applying make-up to make their cleavage more attractive; cleavage was termed the "smile of the bustline" by contemporaneous Belgian chronicler Jean Froissart. A contemporaneous French courtesy manual La Clef d'Amors advised, "If you have a beautiful chest and a beautiful neck do not cover them up but your dress should be low cut so that everyone can gaze and gape after them". Contemporaneous poet Eustache Deschamps advised "a wide-open neckline and a tight dress with slits through which the breasts and the throat could be more visible". Sewing two pouches into one's dress "into which the breasts are squeezed so that the nipples arc thrust upwards" was suggested as well.

The French Catholic Church, however, tried to discourage the flaunting of cleavage. It banned the cleavage, which it referred to as "the gates of hell", and demanded that the opening on women's bodices be laced. French priest Oliver Maillard said women who exposed their breasts would be "strung up in hell by their udders". Monarchs like Charles VII of France ignored the church. It was common for women in his court to wear bodices through which their breasts, cleavage, and nipples could be seen. In 1450, Agnès Sorel, mistress to Charles VII, started a fashion trend when she wore deep, low, square décolleté gowns with fully bared breasts in the French court.

== Early modern ==
The royal connection

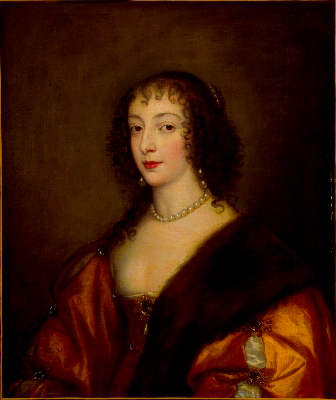
Henrietta Maria of France, queen of England, Scotland, and Ireland and wife of king Charles I, by Anthony van Dyck (circa 1630s)

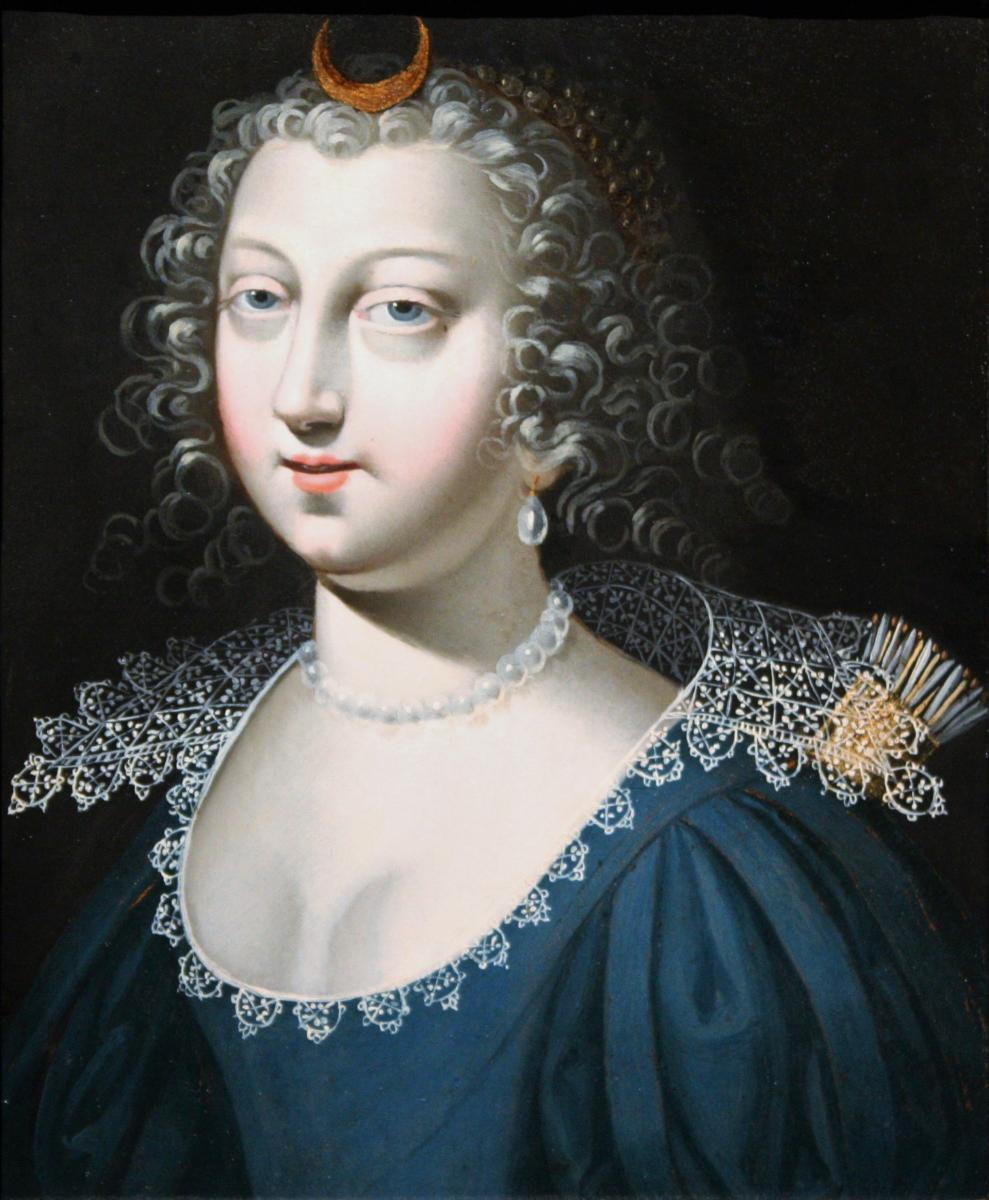
Anne of Austria, Queen of France, was an early 17th century fashion icon wearing dresses that showcased her cleavage

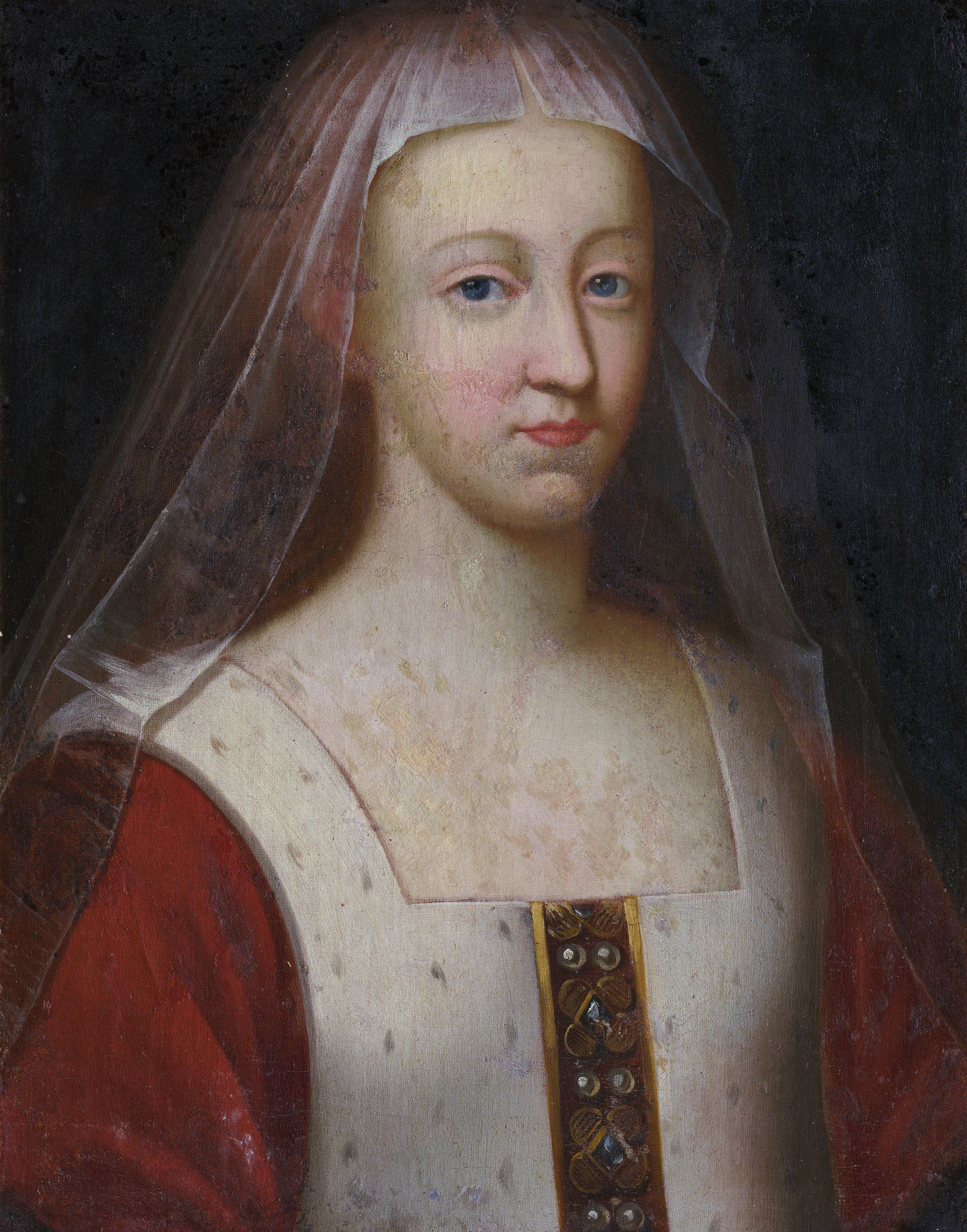
Agnès Sorel

Across Europe, décolletage was often a feature of the dress of the late Middle Ages; this continued through the Victorian period. Gowns that exposed a woman's neck and the top of her chest were very common and uncontroversial in Europe from at least the 14th century until the mid-19th century. Ball gowns and evening gowns especially had low, square décolletage that was designed to display and emphasize cleavage.

In many European societies between the Renaissance and the 19th century, wearing low-cut dresses that exposed breasts was more acceptable than it is in the early 21st century; bared female legs, ankles, and shoulders were considered to be more risqué than exposed breasts. In aristocratic and upper-class circles, the display of breasts was at times regarded as a status symbol–a sign of beauty, wealth, and social position. The bared breast invoked associations with the Ancient Greek nude sculptures that influenced the art, sculpture and architecture of the period.

Fragments of linen textiles found at Lengberg Castle in East Tyrol in Austria dated to between 1440 and 1485 are believed to have been bras. Two of them had cups made from two pieces of linen sewn with fabric that extended to the bottom of the torso with a row of six eyelets for fastening with a lace or string. One had two shoulder straps and was decorated with lace in the cleavage. From the 16th century, the undergarments of wealthier women in the Western world were dominated by the corset, which pushed the breasts upwards. In the later 19th century, clothing designers began experimenting with alternatives, splitting the corset into multiple parts: a girdle-like restraining device for the lower torso, and devices that suspended the breasts from the shoulder to the upper torso.

=== 16th century ===
A tale of two paintings

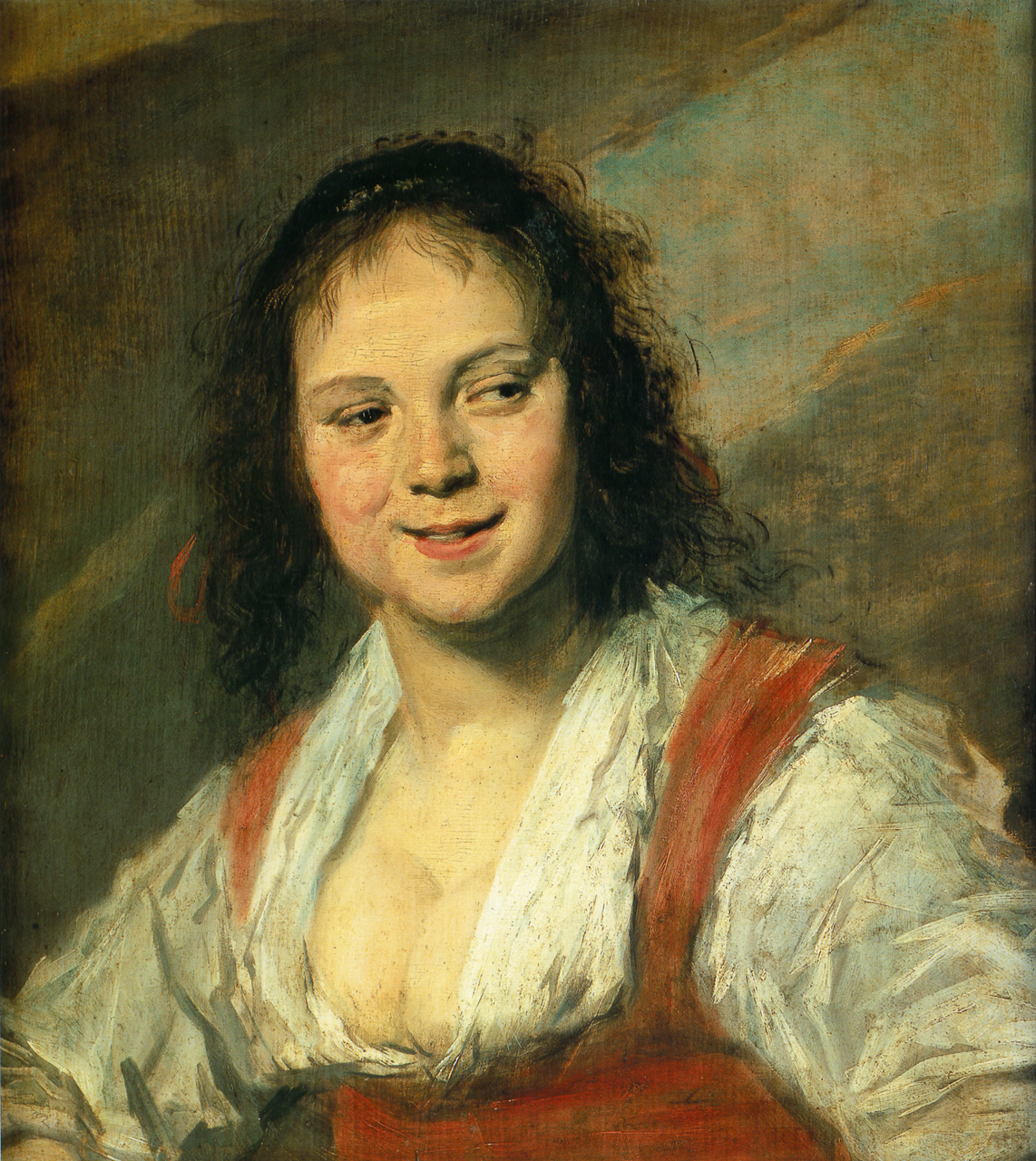
La Bohémienne (c. 1628) by Dutch Golden Age painter Frans Hals, who re-painted it after the initial public exhibition to make the cleavage more daring.

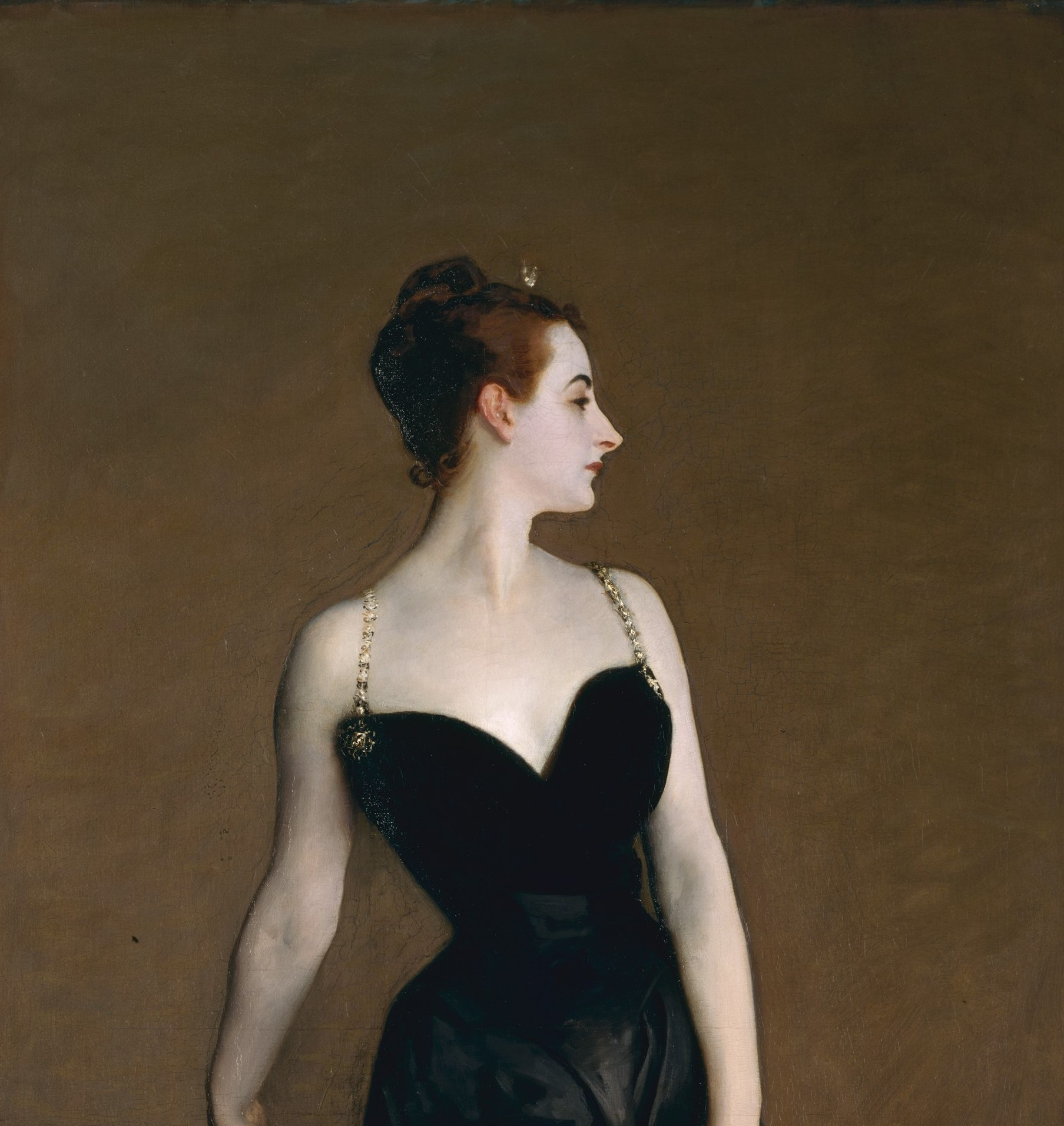
Detail of Portrait of Madame X (1884) by John Singer Sargent, whose cleavage caused enough controversy for Sargent to re-paint and make the cleavage less daring.

In mid-16th-century Turkey, during the reign of Suleiman the Magnificent of the Ottoman Empire, respectability regulations allowed "respectable" women to wear fashionable dresses with exposed cleavage; this privilege was denied to "prostitutes" in an attempt to prevent sex workers from drawing attention to their livelihoods. The entari, a then-popular women's garment, resembled the corseted bodices of Europe without the corset; its narrow top and narrow, long, plunging décolletage exposed a generous cleavage. Around this time, cleavage-revealing gambaz gowns became accepted among married women in the Levant, where bosoms were regarded as a sign of maternity. In Safavid-era Iran, the exaggeratedly décolleté woman in art represented European woman.

In 16th-century India, during the Mughal Empire, Hindu women started emulating their conquerors by covering their shoulders and breasts, though in contemporaneous paintings, women of Mughal palaces were often portrayed wearing Rajput-style cholis and breast jewelry. Mughal paintings often portrayed women with extraordinarily daring décolletage. Contemporaneous Rajput paintings often depict women wearing semi-transparent cholis that cover only the upper part of their breasts.

In the 16th century, when Spanish conquistadors colonized the Inca Empire, traditional cleavage-revealing and colorful Inca dresses were replaced by high necks and covered bosoms.

In European societies during the 16th century, women's fashions with exposed breasts were common across the class spectrum. Anne of Brittany has been painted wearing a dress with a square neckline. Low, square décolleté styles were popular in 17th-century England; Queen Mary II and Henrietta Maria, wife of Charles I of England, were depicted with widely bared breasts. Architect Inigo Jones designed a masque costume for Henrietta Maria that widely revealed both of her breasts. Cleavage-enhancing corsets, which used whalebone and other stiff materials to create a desired silhouette—a fashion that was also adopted by men for their coats—were introduced in the mid-16th century.

=== 17th century ===
Cleavage in the East

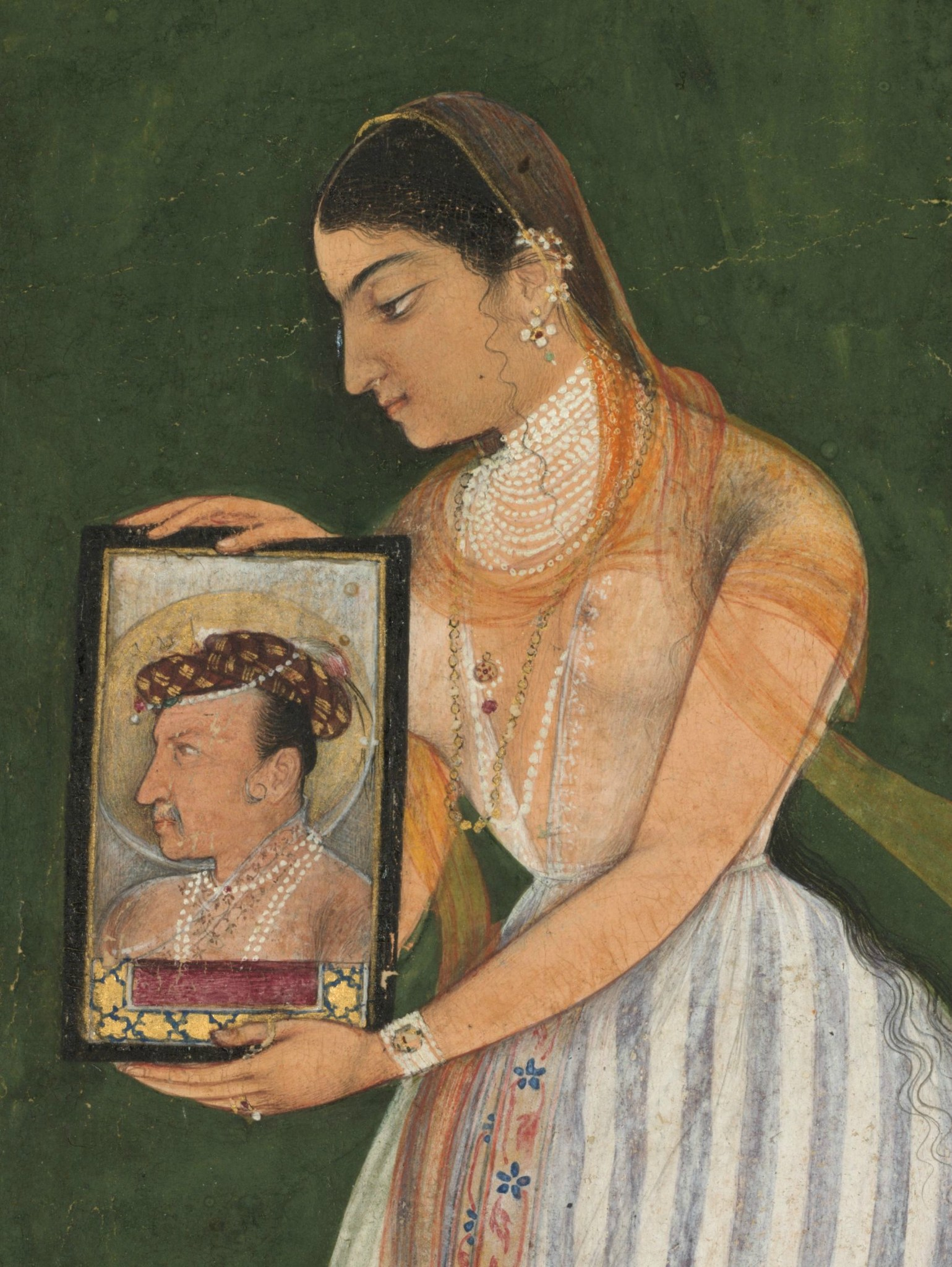
Empress Nur Jahan (1577-1645) of the Mughal Empire. Nur Jahan and queen Jodha Bai are seen painted in décolleté cloths

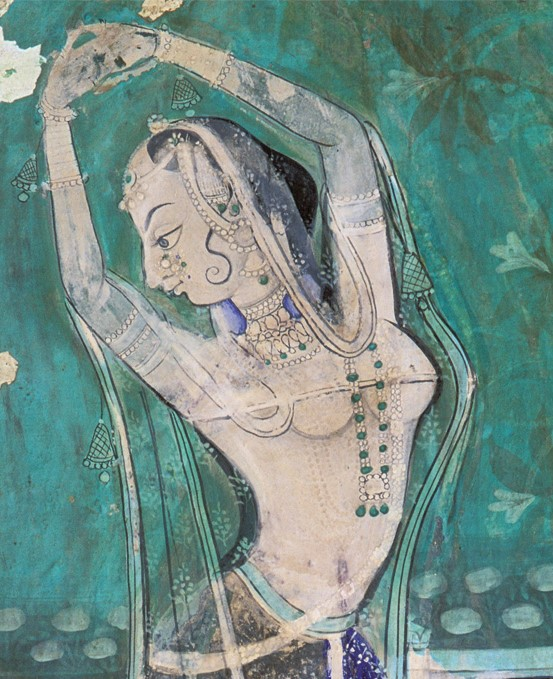
Rajput painting of Chitrashala Dancer from Bundi (circa 1640s) showing exposed underboob, which remained banned by laws and policies as late as 2020 in places from the US to Thailand

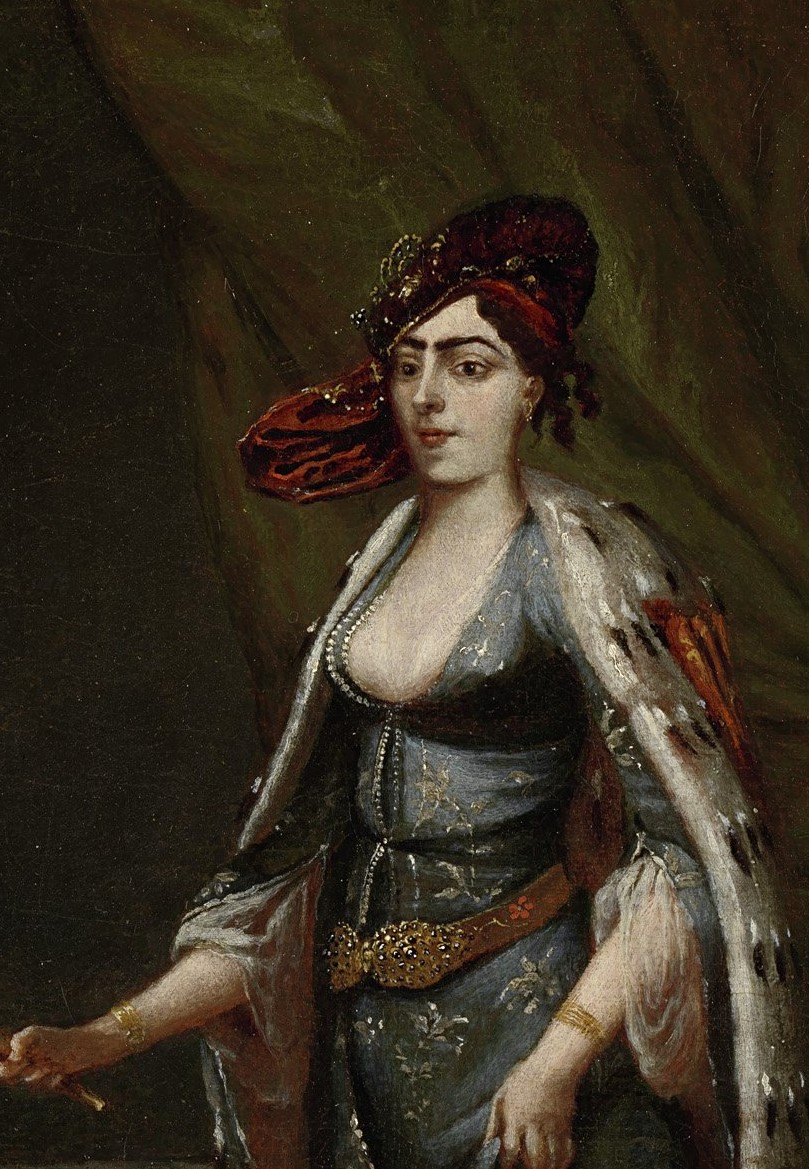
Turkish Woman (circa 1730) by Jean Baptiste Vanmour, an expatriate in Ottoman Turkey during the Tulip Era

Throughout the 16th century, shoulder straps stayed on the shoulders but as the 17th century progressed, they moved down the shoulders and across the top of the arms, and by the mid-17th century, the oval neckline of the period became commonplace. By the end of the century, necklines at the front of women's garments started to drop even lower. During the extreme décolletage of the Elizabethan era, necklines were often decorated with frills and strings of pearls, and were sometimes covered with tuckers and partlets (called a tasselo in Italy and la modiste in France). Late Elizabethan corsets, with their rigid, suppressive fronts, manipulated a woman's figure into a flat, cylindrical silhouette with a deep cleavage. Contemporaneous French fashion, including the Spanish-style high neckline and face-framing ruff, started to gain popularity in Italy, replacing the Medici-style décolletage.

Around 1610, flat collars started replacing neck trims, allowing provocative cleavage that was sometimes covered with a handkerchief. During the Georgian era, pendants became popular as décolletage decoration. Anne of Austria, along with female members of her court, was known for wearing very tight bodices and corsets that forced breasts together to make deeper cleavage, very low necklines that exposed breasts almost in entirety above the areolae, and pendants lying on the cleavage to highlight it. After the French Revolution, décolletage become larger at the front and reduced at the back. During the fashions of 1795–1820, many women wore dresses that bared necks, bosoms and shoulders. Increasingly, the amount of décolletage became a major difference between day-wear and formal gowns.

Cleavage was not without controversy. In 1713, British newspaper The Guardian complained about women mostly eschewing the tucker, and letting their necks and the tops of their breasts remain uncovered. English poet and essayist Joseph Addison complained about décolletage so extreme "the neck of a fine woman at present take in almost half the body". Publications advised women against "unmasking their beauties". 18th-century news correspondents wrote that "otherwise polite, genteel women looked like common prostitutes". In Edo period Japan there is very little emphasis on breasts in the erotic Shunga art, as men were less interested in the breasts. 19th-century Japanese society was rather shocked by the décolletage of Western women.

During the French Enlightenment, there was a debate about whether female breasts were merely a sensual enticement or a natural gift to be offered from mother to child. Not all women in France wore the open-neck style without modifications; a self-portrait by Adélaïde Labille-Guiard (France, 1785) shows the painter in a fashionable décolleté dress while her pupils have their bosoms accessorized with gauzy handkerchiefs. Nearly a century later, also in France, a man from the provinces who attended a court ball at the Tuileries in Paris in 1855 was disgusted by the décolleté dresses and is said to have said; "I haven't seen anything like that since I was weaned!". In 1890, the first breast augmentation was performed using an injection of liquid paraffin.

== Late modern ==
=== 18th century ===
Cleavage in the West

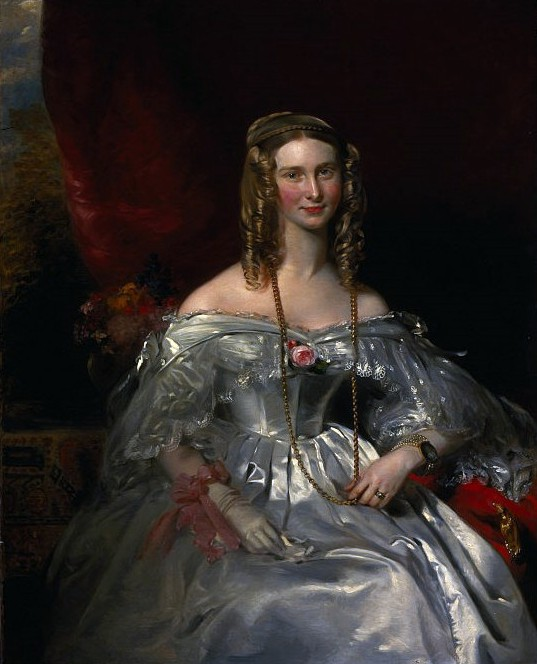
Hannah Fry, daughter of Reverend Thomas Fry, wearing a dress with Bertha neckline by Andrew Geddes (1838)

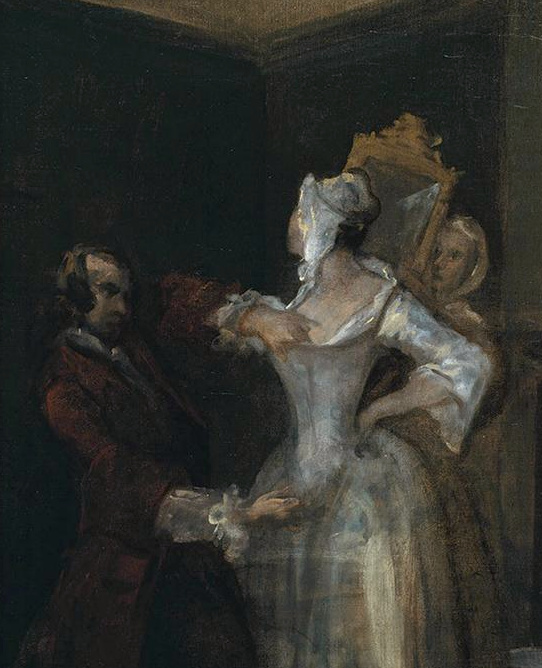
Detail of Das Korsett (1774) by William Hogarth, which is also seen as a commentary on male intrusion

By the end of the 18th century in Continental Europe, cleavage-enhancing corsets grew more dramatic, pushing the breasts upward. The tight lacing of corsets worn in the 19th and early 20th centuries emphasized both cleavage and the size of the bust and hips. Evening gowns and ball gowns were especially designed to display and emphasize the décolletage. Elaborate necklaces decorated the décolletage at parties and balls by 1849. There was also a trend of wearing camisole-like clothes and whale-bone corsets that gave the wearer a bust without a separation or any cleavage. Despite the contemporaneous popularity of décolletage dresses, complete exposure of breasts in portraits was limited to two groups of women; the scandalous (mistresses and prostitutes), and the pure (breastfeeding mothers and queens). In North America, the Gilded Age saw women adorning their cleavage with flowers attached to clothes and carefully placed jewelry.

=== 19th century ===
During the Victorian period of the mid-to-late 19th century, social attitudes required women to cover their bosoms in public. High collars were the norm for ordinary wear. Towards the end of this period, the full collar was in fashion, though some décolleté dresses were worn on formal occasions. For that purpose, the Bertha neckline, which lay below the shoulders and was often trimmed with three to six inches (7.6 to 15.2 cm) of lace or other decorative material, became popular with upper and middle-class women but it was socially unacceptable for working-class women to expose that much skin. Multiple pearl necklaces were worn to cover the décolletage. Along with the Bertha neckline, straps were removed from corsets and shawls were made essential. In France, Belle Époque time photographs often featured Chinese fans to draw attention to the exposed cleavage.

Portrait of Madame X, an 1884 painting by John Singer Sargent of American-born Parisian socialite Virginie Amélie Avegno Gautreau, was heavily criticized for depicting her in a sleek black dress displaying what was considered scandalous cleavage and with her right shoulder strap having fallen off her shoulder. The controversy was so great Sargent reworked the painting to move the shoulder strap from her upper arm to her shoulder. Sargent left Paris for London in 1884. John Dudgeon, a Scottish missionary in China in the late 19th century, appreciated the Chinese non-décolleté fashion as a protection for the "abdomin and chest".

=== 1900–1910s ===
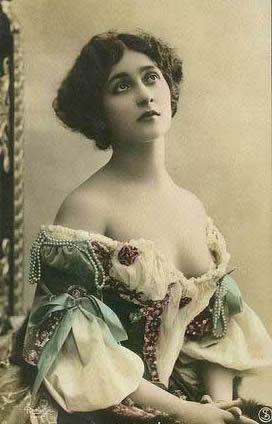
Italian soprano Lina Cavalieri, known for her décolletage as much as her talent, at the turn of the 20th century. She was portrayed in her biopic The World's Most Beautiful Woman by Gina Lollobrigida, the Italian actress engaged in a "cleavage war" with her archrival Sophia Loren.

By 1904, necklines of evening attire were lowered, exposing the shoulders, sometimes without straps but the neckline still ended above the cleavage. Clergymen all over the world were shocked when dresses with modest round or V-shaped necklines became fashionable around 1913. In the German Empire, Roman Catholic bishops issued a pastoral letter attacking the new fashions. In the Edwardian era, extreme uplift with no hint of cleavage was as common as a bow-fronted look that was also popular. In 1908, a single rubber pad or a "bust form" was worn inside the front of the bodice to make cleavage virtually undetectable.

The word "cleavage" was first used in the early 19th century in geology and mineralogy to mean the tendency of crystals, minerals and rocks to split along definite planes. By the mid-19th century, it was generally used to mean splitting along a line of division into two or more parts.

=== 1920s–1930s ===
The Flapper generation of 1920s flattened their chests to adopt the fashionable "boy-girl" look by either bandaging their breasts or by using bust flatteners. Corsets started to go out of fashion by 1917, when metal was needed to make tanks and munitions for World War I and due to the vogue for boyish figures. In New Zealand, the early appearance of décolleté clothes in 1914 was soon superseded by the "flat" fashion. Breast suppression prevailed in the Western world so much the U.S. physician Lillian Farrar attributed "virginal atrophic prolapsed breasts" to the fashion imperatives of the time. In 1920, paraffin was replaced for breast augmentation with fatty tissue taken from the abdomen and buttocks.

Frustrated with the whalebone corset, New York socialite Mary Phelps Jacob (better known as Caresse Crosby) created the first brassière from two handkerchiefs and some ribbon to show off her cleavage. In 1914, Jacob patented the garment as "the backless brassiere"; after making a few hundred garments, she sold the patent to The Warner Brothers Corset Company for US$1,500. In the next 30 years, Warner Brothers made more than US$15 million from Jacob's design. During the next century, the brassière industry went through many ups and downs, often influenced by the demand for cleavage.

With a return to more womanly figures in the 1930s, corsetry maintained a strong demand, even at the height of the Great Depression. From the 1920s to the 1940s, corset manufacturers constantly tried training young women to use corsets but fashions became more restrained in terms of décolletage while exposure of the leg became more accepted in Western societies during World War I and remained so for nearly half a century. In the Republic of China in the early 20th century, qipao, a dress that shows the legs but no cleavage, became so popular many Chinese women consider it as their national dress.

Male cleavage (also known as "heavage"), a result of low necklines or unbuttoned shirts, has been a movie trend since the 1920s. Douglas Fairbanks revealed his chest in films including The Thief of Bagdad (1924) and The Iron Mask (1929), and Errol Flynn showed his male cleavage in movies like The Adventures of Robin Hood (1938).

=== 1940s ===
Movie connection

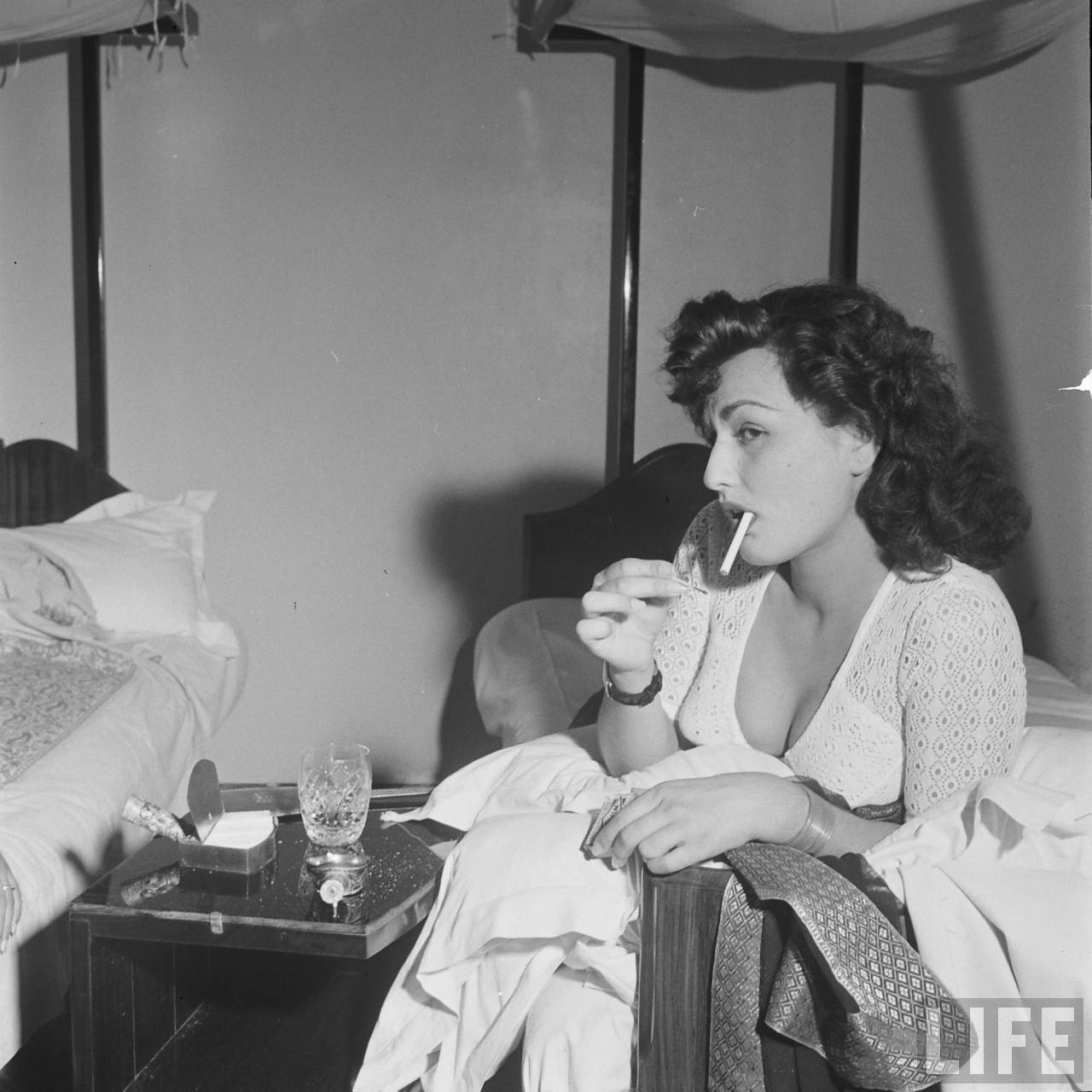
Bollywood actress Begum Para became the first Indian actress on Life (December 31, 1951). The photo feature by James Burke made her into Indian movie industry's first "pin-up girl" Her photos were also popular among US soldiers in the Korean War.

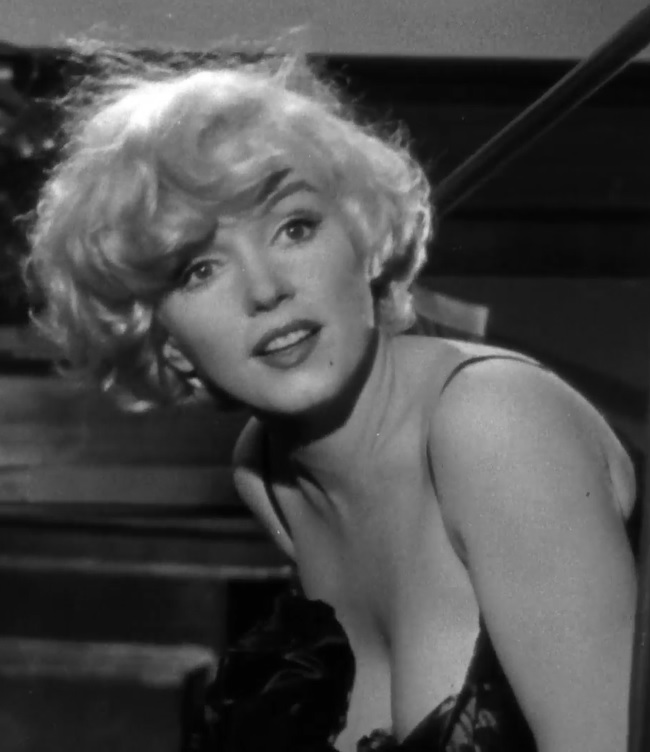
Hollywood actress Marilyn Monroe, in Some Like It Hot (1959). She once said, "The trouble with censors is that they worry if a girl has cleavage. They ought to worry if she hasn't any." She was voted a cleavage queen 50 years after her death.

In the 1940s, a substantial amount of fabric in the center of brassières created a separation of breasts rather than a pushed-together cleavage. In 1947, Frederick Mellinger of Frederick's of Hollywood created the first padded brassière followed a year later by an early push-up version dubbed "The Rising Star". In that decade, Christian Dior introduced a "new look" that included elastic corsets, pads and shaping girdles to widen hips, cinch waists and lift breasts.

Under the Motion Picture Production Code, which was in effect in the U.S. between 1934 and 1968, the depiction of excessive cleavage was not permitted. Many female actors defied those standards; other celebrities, performers and models followed suit and the public was not far behind. Low-cut styles of various depths were common. In the post-war period, cleavage became a defining emblem; according to writer Peter Lewis; "The bust, bosom or cleavage was in the Fifties the apotheosis of erogenous zones. The breasts were the apples of all eyes." Around this time, the American word "cleavage" started to be used to define the space between the breasts.

In the 1940s, Joseph Breen, head of the U.S. Production Code Administration (PCA), applied the term to breasts in reference to actress Jane Russell's costumes and poses in the 1941 movie The Outlaw. The term was also applied in the evaluation of the British films The Wicked Lady (1945), starring Margaret Lockwood and Patricia Roc; Bedelia (1946), also starring Lockwood; and Pink String and Sealing Wax (1945), starring Googie Withers. This use of the term was first covered in a Time article titled "Cleavage & the Code" on August 5, 1946, as a "Johnston Office (the popular name for Motion Picture Association of America (MPAA) office at the time) trade term for the shadowed depression dividing an actress' bosom into two distinct sections." The word "cleavage" is made of the root verb "cleave" (to split, from Old English clifian and Middle English clevien ("cleft" in past tense) and the suffix age (meaning "the state of" or "the act of").

Development of the underwire bra started in the 1930s, though it did not gain widespread popularity until the 1950s, when the end of World War II freed metal for domestic use. Aviator and filmmaker Howard Hughes' overemphasizing of Russell's cleavage prompted the MPAA to take actions against the film and use the term "cleavage" in association with breasts. Hughes and Russell are considered pioneers of exaggerated cleavage in movies. For the film Hughes designed a prototype for an underwire bra to give Russell "five and one-quarter inches" long cleavage.

Contrary to many media reports afterward, Russell did not wear the bra during filming; according to her 1988 autobiography, she said the bra was so uncomfortable that she secretly discarded it. She wrote that the "ridiculous" contraption hurt so much that she wore it for only a few minutes, and instead wore her own bra. To prevent Hughes from noticing, Russell padded the cups with tissue and tightened the shoulder straps before returning to the set. She later said "I never wore it in The Outlaw, and he never knew. He wasn't going to take my clothes off to check if I had it on. I just told him I did." The famed bra ended up in a Hollywood museum—a false witness to the push-up myth.

Margaret Lockwood became one of the biggest star of British films in the 1940s as audiences were scandalized by her decolletage that was quite mild by later standards. In the 1940s, a club called "Faye Emerson Plunging Neckline Club of Brooklyn" was founded as a tribute to American actress Faye Emerson. Gina Lollobrigida raised eyebrows with her famous low-cut dress in 1960. Hollywood actress Helen Talbot said that she was expected to wear falsies while shooting in the 1940s. At least one British film, The Wicked Lady, had to be partially reshot due to period costumes that were deemed overly revealing. In 1953, Hollywood film The French Line was found objectionable under the Hays Code because of Jane Russell's "breast shots in bathtub, cleavage and breast exposure" while some of her décolleté gowns were thought "intentionally designed to give a bosom peep-show effect beyond even extreme decolletage."

== Early contemporary ==
=== 1950s ===
The unbuttoned 1970s
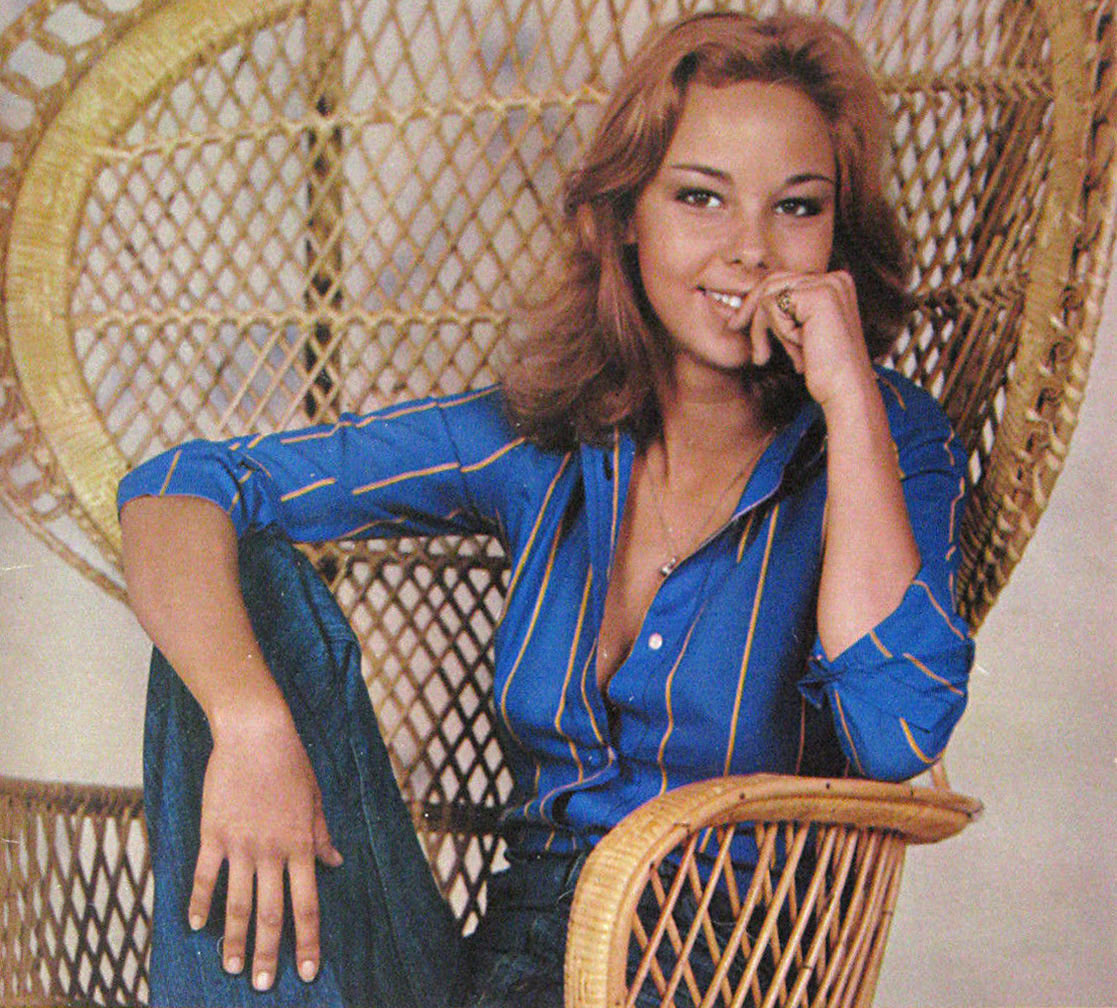
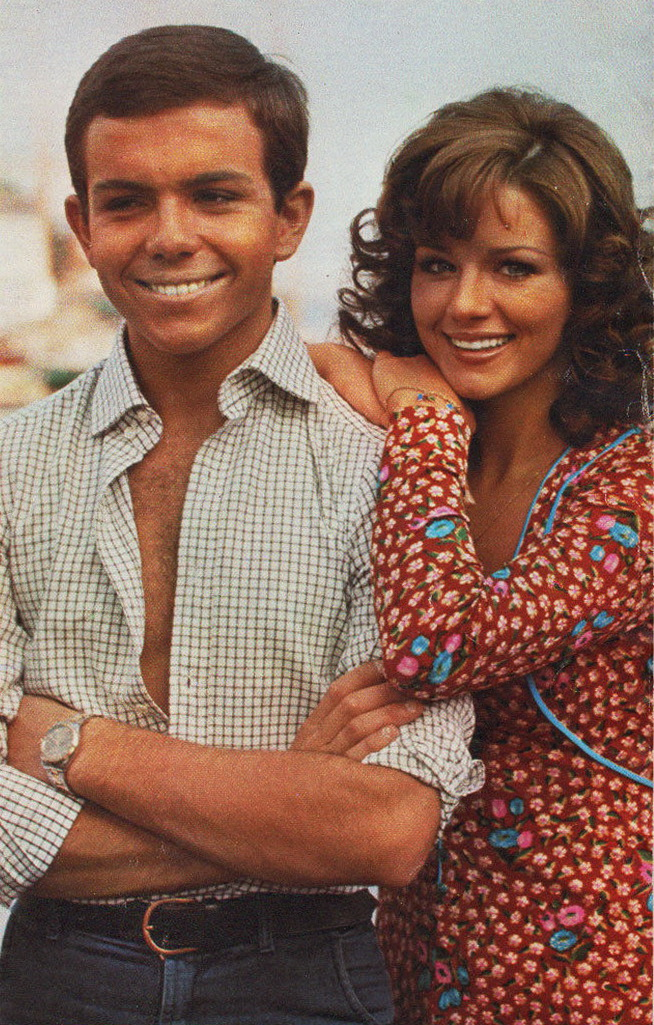
Italian actors Claudia Marsani (1975), on the left, and Alessandro Momo (1974), on the right, sporting the unbuttoned shirt look popular in the western world in 1970s

According to an urban American woman, during the 1950s, "At night our shoulders were naked, our breasts half-bare". Dramatic necklaces that emphasized the cleavage became popular at balls and parties in France. In the U.S., television shows tried to mask exposed cleavage with tulle and even sketches, illustrations and short stories in Reader's Digest and Saturday Evening Post depicted women with tiny waists, big buttocks and ample cleavage. In this decade, Hollywood and the fashion industry successfully promoted large, cloven bustlines and falsies, the brassière industry started experimenting with the half-cup bra (also known as demi-cup or shelf bra) to facilitate décolletage. Polyvinyl sacs were often the preferred implant to augment breasts into a fuller, more projected appearance.

Despite these developments, open presentation of cleavage was mostly limited to well-endowed female actors like Lana Turner, Marilyn Monroe (who was attributed with the revelation America's "mammary madness" by journalist Marjorie Rosen), Rita Hayworth, Jane Russell, Brigitte Bardot, Jayne Mansfield and Sophia Loren, who were as celebrated for their cleavage as for their beauty. While these movie stars significantly influenced the appearance of women's busts in this decade, the stylish 1950s sweaters were a safer substitute for many women. Lingerie manufacturer Berlei launched the "Hollywood Maxwell" brassière, claiming it to be a "favourite of film stars".

=== 1960s ===
Modern augmentation mammaplasty began when Thomas Cronin and Frank Gerow developed the first silicone gel-filled breast prosthesis with Dow Corning Corporation, and the first implanting operation took place the following year. In the late 1960s, attention began to shift from the large bust to the trim lower torso, reasserting the need to diet, especially as new clothing fashions—brief, sheer, and close fitting—prohibited heavy reliance on foundation lingerie. Legs were comparatively less emphasized as elements of beauty. Décolleté dresses were sighted in modern Palestine region only after establishment of the state of Israel.

In the 1960s, driven by second-wave feminism, liberal politics and the free love movement, a bra burning movement arose to protest against—among various patriarchal imperatives—constructed cleavage and disciplined breasts. Yves Saint Laurent and U.S. designer Rudi Gernreich experimented with a bra-less look on the runway. The increasingly casual styles of the 1960s led to a bra-less look when women who were unwilling to give up bras turned to soft bras that did not lift and "were as light and discreet as possible" but still provided support. In post revolution China, zhongshan zhuang or the Mao suit became the prescribed cloth for both men and women, hiding the breasts completely.

In fall 1963 and spring 1964 the Western fashion trends were dominated by plunging necklines, while the movie goers were charmed by movies like Tom Jones that portrayed "aggressive cleavages". Lingerie and shapewear manfucturers like Warner Brothers, Gossard, Formfit, and Bali took the opportunity to market plunge bras. From the 1960s, changes in fashion leaned towards increased displays of cleavage in films and television; Jane Russell and Elizabeth Taylor were the biggest stars who led the fashion. In everyday life, low-cut dress styles became common, even for casual wear. Lingerie and shapewear manufacturers like Warner Brothers, Gossard, Formfit and Bali took the opportunity to market plunge bras with a lower gore that was suitable for low-cut styles.

The aesthetic of male cleavage continued into the 1950s and 1960s with movie stars like Marlon Brando, who also displayed his chest in The Adventures of Robin Hood, and Sean Connery in his many James Bond movies. The fashion tapered out since the 1970s, which according to fashion historian Robert Bryan, was "the golden age of male chest hair", epitomized by John Travolta in Saturday Night Fever (1977).

=== 1970s ===
In the early 1970s, it became common to leave top buttons on shirts and blouses open to display pectoral muscles and cleavage. Daring women and men of all ages wore tailored, buttoned-down shirts that were open from the breast-point to the navel in a "groovy" style, with pendants, beads or medallions dangling on the chest, displaying a firm body achieved through exercise. The most important article of clothing in a woman's 1970s wardrobe were a man-tailored blazer and shirt, as women continued to appropriate traditionally male clothing for their own fashions.

Throughout the 1970s, more men unbuttoned their shirts as both men and women took an anti-fashion approach to clothing and the rise of the leisure wear, and adopted comfortable, unisex styles. As a new masculine style evolved, gay men adopted a traditionally masculine or working-class style with "half-unbuttoned shirt above the sweaty chest" and tight jeans, rejecting the idea male homosexuals want to be female.

This look was also popular with celebrities like Mick Jagger and Burt Reynolds in the 1970s, and Harry Styles, Jude Law, Simon Cowell and Kanye West in the 2010s.

=== 1980s ===
During the 1980s, deep, plunging cleavage became more common and less risqué as the popularity of work-outs and masculine shoulder-padded blazers increased. In 1985, designer Vivienne Westwood re-introduced the corset as a trendy way to enhance cleavage. It was followed in 1989 by Jean Paul Gaultier, who dressed Madonna in a pink corset. Soon, Westwood introduced an elastic-sided variant that worked as a balcony to push up the cleavage.

=== 1990s ===
Drivers of trend

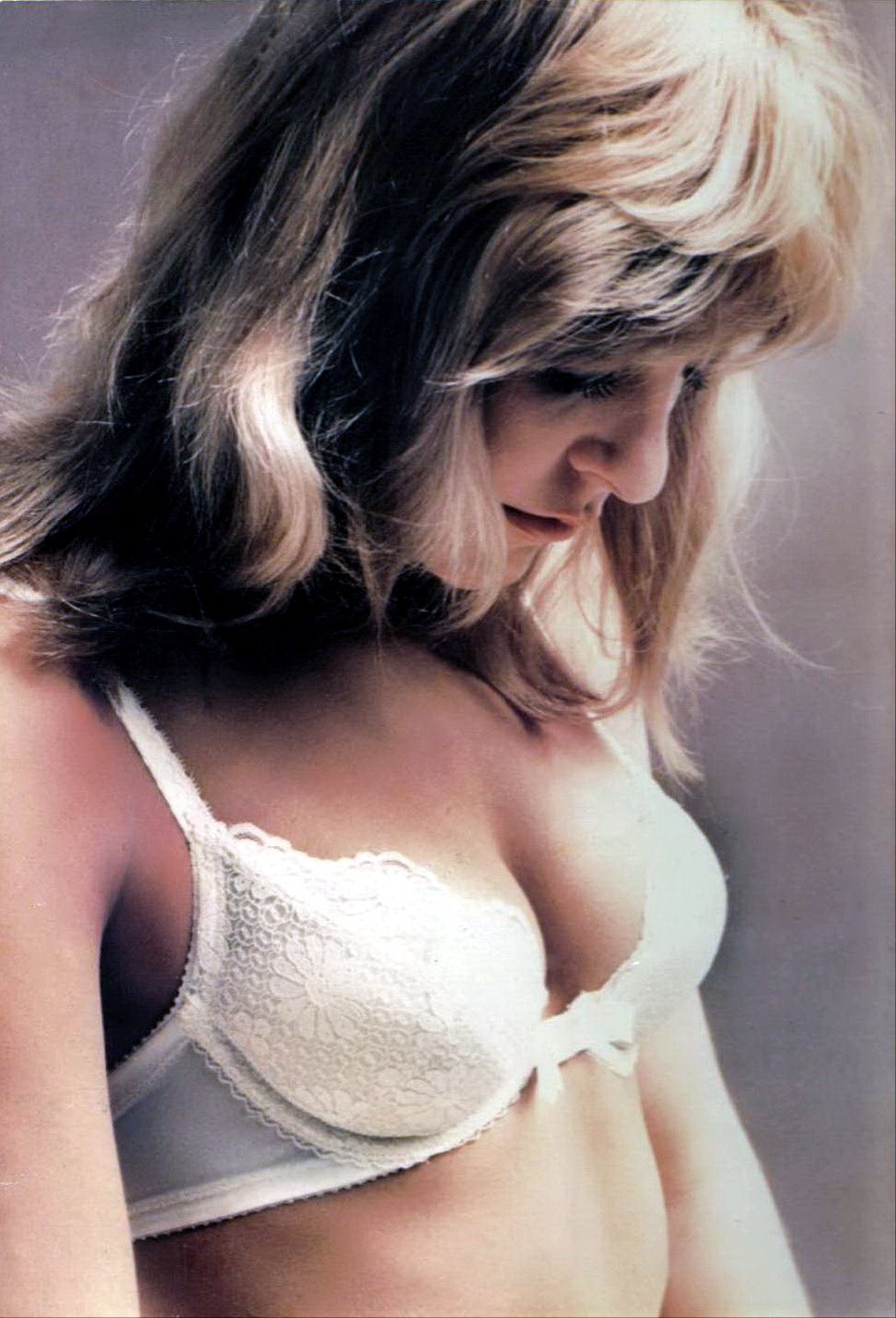
Wonderbra (1975)

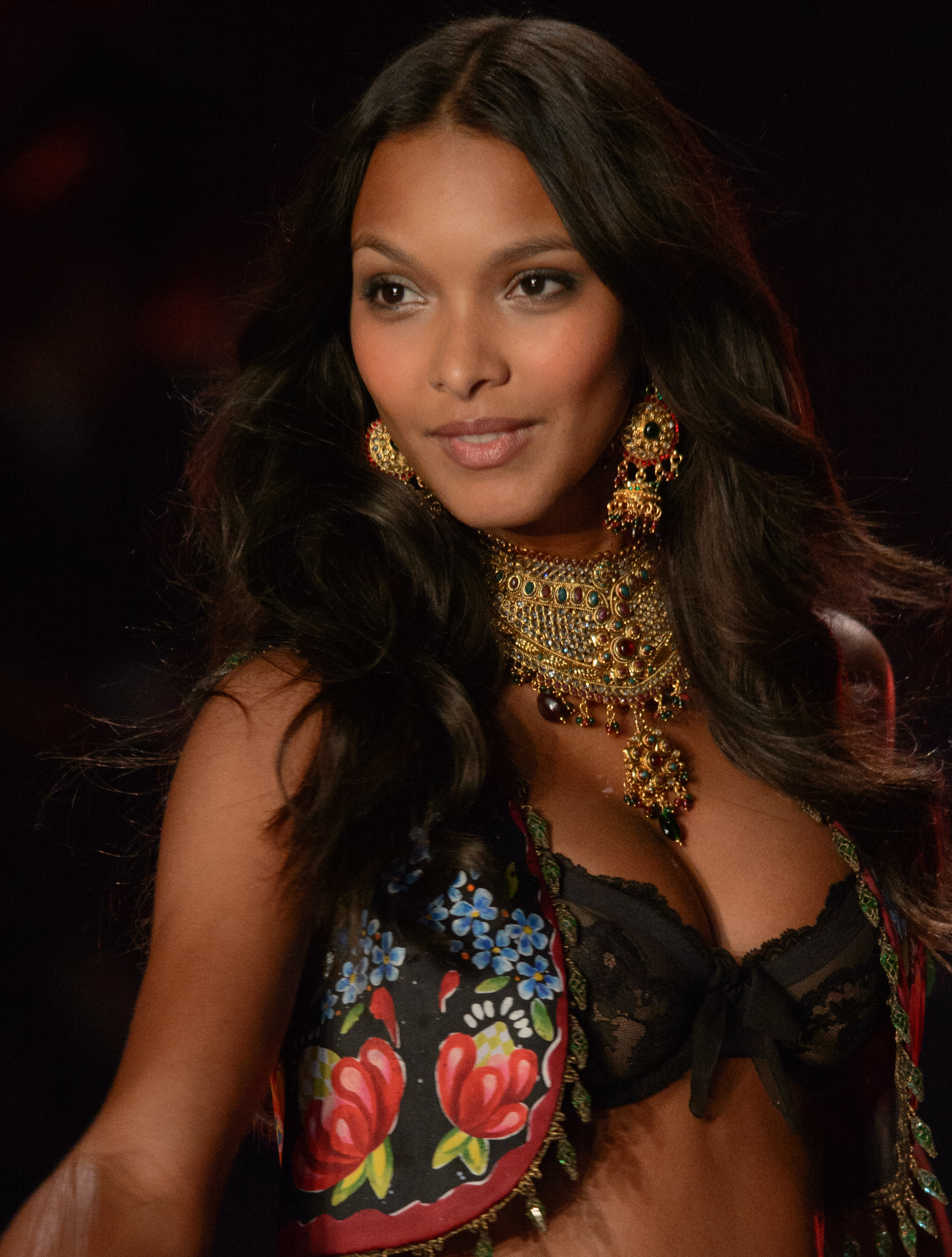
Victoria's Secret (2014)

The push-up bra and exaggerated cleavage became popular in the 1990s. In 1992, the bra and girdle industry in America posted sales of over US$1 billion. The Wonderbra brand, which had existed elsewhere, entered the U.S. market in 1994 with a newly designed, cleavage-enhancing bra. Driven by a controversial advertising campaign that featured model Eva Herzigova's cleavage, one Wonderbra was sold every 15 seconds shortly after the brand's launch, leading to first-year sales of US$120 million. The hypersexualized styles of Victoria's Secret became a "zeitgeist" in the 1990s. By 2013, Victoria's Secret had captured one-third of the women's underwear market in the U.S. In the early 1990s, Sara Lee Corporation—then owner of the Wonderbra and Playtex brands—along with UK lingerie manufacturer Gossard, introduced a bra for Asian women who, according to Sara Lee, are "less buxom [and have] narrower shoulders". Traditional brands like Maidenform produced similar styles. In its February 1999 issue, American men's magazine Esquire ran a widely criticized cover story titled "Triumph of Cleavage Culture".

Lingerie manufacturers controlled and constructed the mandatory bustline of the 1990s. In their heyday, Wonderbra sponsored a National Cleavage Day in South Africa every year, and the webcast of the Victoria's Secret show became one of Internet's biggest events. By 2001, the event was being aired on network television with 12 million viewers for the first broadcast. Other lingerie manufacturers like Frederick's of Hollywood and Agent Provocateur also joined the competition by that time, with the former introducing a design called Hollywood Extreme Cleavage Bra that helped give the impression of a spherical cleavage like augmented breasts that was popularized by stars like Pamela Anderson.

In the late-20th-century India, cleavage became a staple point of attraction in Bollywood movies. By the 2010s, Indian men and women wearing décolleté clothes were seen as fashion statements and not, as in the past, as a sign of desperation. At the same time, onscreen cleavage waned as a point of attraction as cleavage-revealing clothes became more commonplace. Both male and female respondents to a 2006 study conducted in Mumbai, young people believe that women wearing cleavage revealing filmi (movie-like) clothes may be more prone to become victims of sexual violence.

In India, male cleavage became popular with Bollywood movie stars Salman Khan (who was named "the king of cleavage" by The Economic Times), Shekhar Suman in the 1990s, and Shahid Kapoor and Akshay Kumar in the 2000s. Many male K-pop stars are also known for their cleavage.

== Late contemporary ==
=== 2000s ===
Corsets then and now

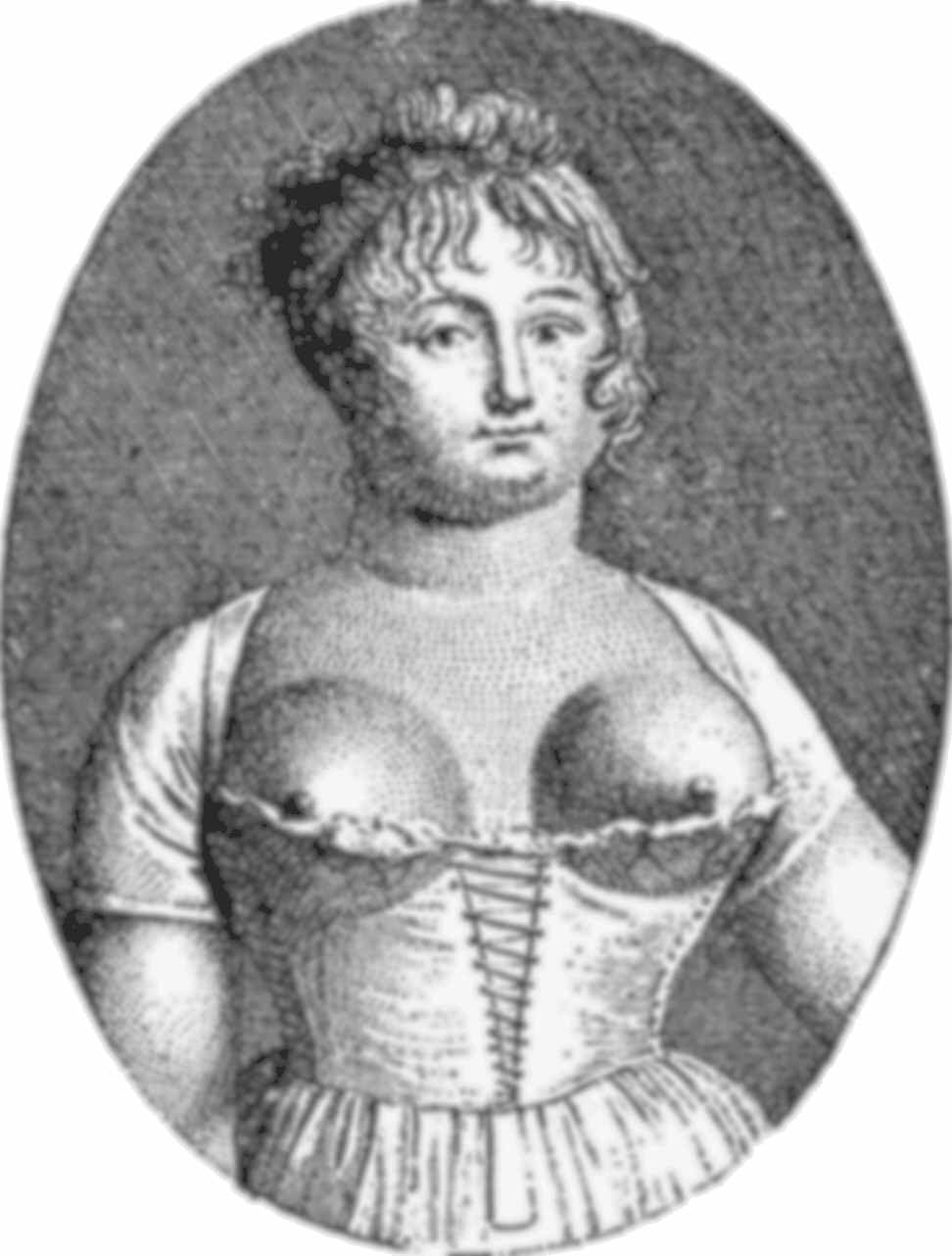
Corset, 1808

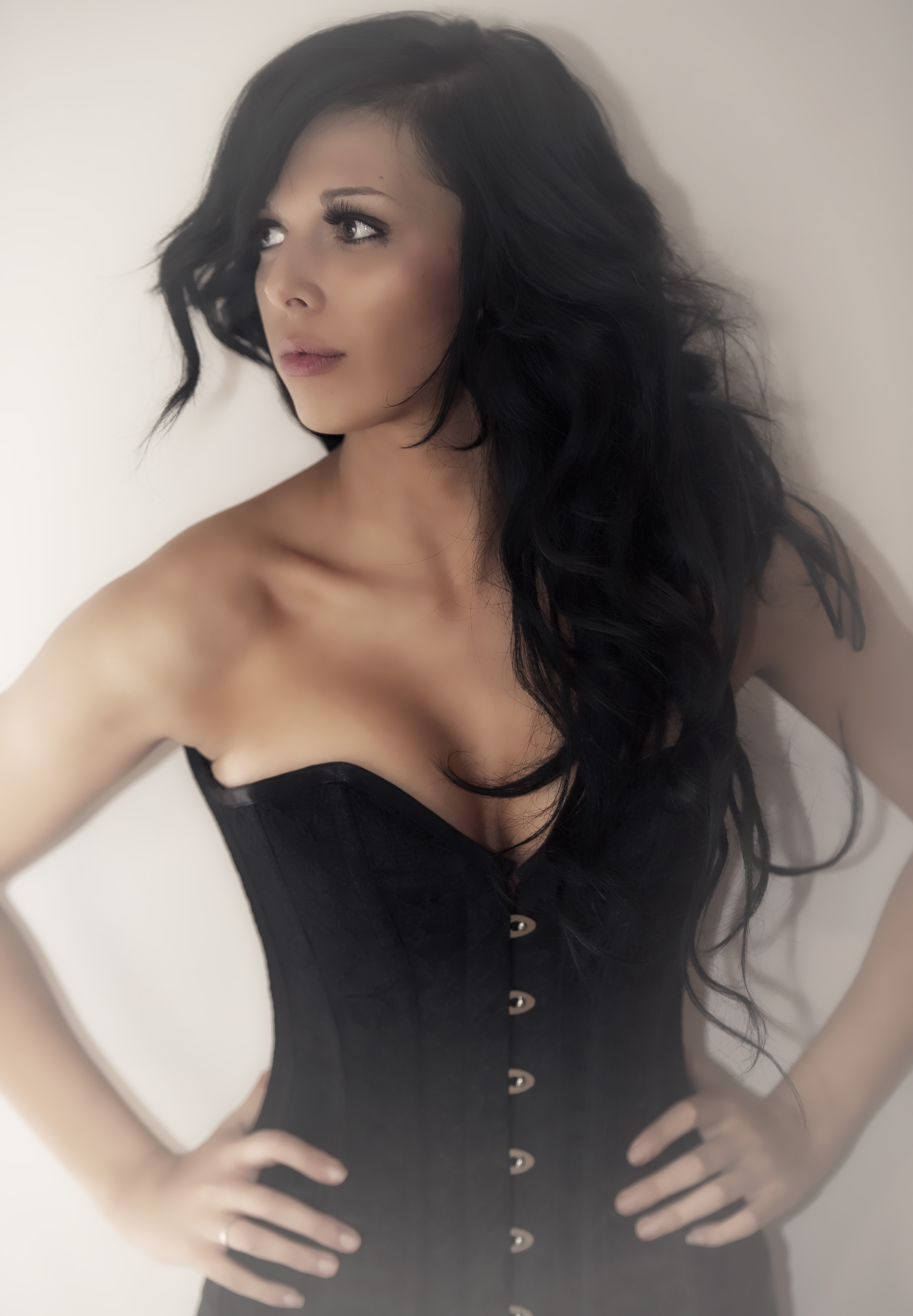
Corset, 2010

Underwire bras, the most popular cleavage-boosting lingerie, accounted for 60% of the UK bra market in 2000. and 70% in 2005. About 70% of women who wear bras wear a steel underwire bra according to underwear manufacturer S&S Industries of New York in 2009. In 2001, 70% (350 million) of the bras sold in the U.S. were underwire bras. As of 2005, underwire bras were the fastest-growing segment of the market. Corsets also experienced a resurgence in the 2010s; this trend was driven by photographs on social media. According to fashion historian Valerie Steele, "The corset did not so much disappear as become internalised through diet, exercise and plastic surgery".

By the turn of the 21st century, some of the attention given to cleavage and breasts started to shift to buttocks, especially in the media, while corsetry returned to mainstream fashion. According to dietician Rebecca Scritchfield, the resurgent popularity of corsets is driven by "the picture on Instagram of somebody with a tiny waist and giant boobs". British actress Keira Knightley, who had her breasts digitally enlarged on the U.S. versions of the poster for Pirates of the Caribbean: Dead Man's Chest and King Arthur, said that women are "not actually allowed to be on a [magazine] cover in the US without at least a C cup because it turns people off."

At the same time alternatives to décolletage, which were often still called cleavages, emerged from Western cleavage culture. By the early 2000s, "sideboob" (also known as "side cleavage" and "sidewinders")—the exposure of the side of the breast—had become popular; one writer called it the "new cleavage". Gabriele Hackworthy, fashion director at Harper's Bazaar, declared, "The look is unlikely to fade fast, with Yves Saint Laurent and Roberto Cavalli both pushing the silhouette next season." The term was included in the Oxford English Dictionary by 2014.

In 2008, Armand Limnander wrote in The New York Times the "underboob" (also known as "bottom cleavage" and "reverse cleavage") was "a newly fetishized anatomical zone where the lower part of the breast meets the torso, popularized by 80s rock chicks in cutoff tank tops". It was further popularized by dancer-singer Teyana Taylor in the music video for Kanye West's 2016 song "Fade". Supermodels, including Bella Hadid, Gigi Hadid, and Kendall Jenner (who reportedly said, "underboob is my thing"), contributed to the trend, which has appeared at beaches, on the red carpet, and in social media posts. Fashion writer Maria Puente said in summer 2017, "cleavage is so old-fashioned and sideboobs are so over", while Kristina Rodulfo of Elle proposed that "underboob is the new sideboob." In 2009, Slovenian lingerie manufacturer Lisca introduced a high-tech "Smart Memory Bra" that was supposed to push breasts further when its wearer becomes sexually aroused.

=== 2010s ===
Other "cleavages"

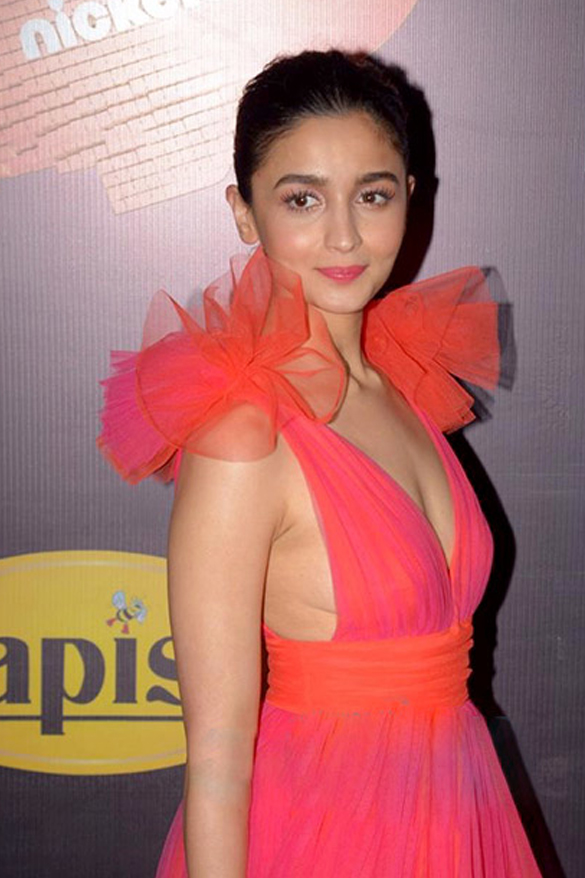
Bollywood actress Alia Bhatt wearing a sideboob gown

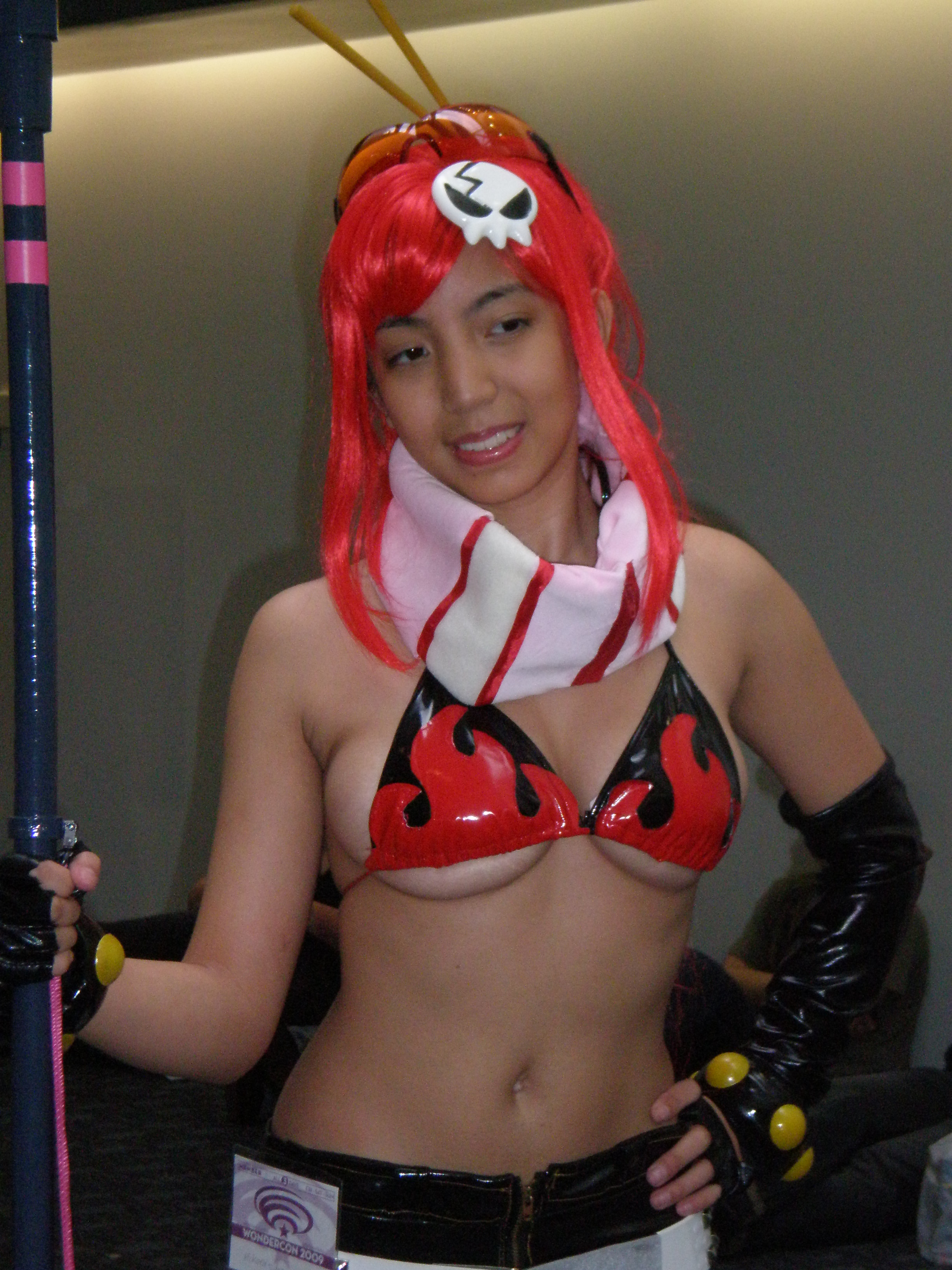
Cosplayer dressing as Yoko Littner in an underboob bikini top

Male cleavage came back into style in the 2010s, especially among hipsters and Hispanic and Latino Americans. Fashion entrepreneur Harvey Paulvin said a men's V-neck should be between "two to four inches from the collar". Some men groom their chest hair to improve the male cleavage look (sometimes known as "manscaping"). Many still considered the look inappropriate for most situations.

In the 2010s and early 2020s, particularly during the COVID-19 lockdowns, cleavage-enhancing bras began to decline in popularity. Bralettes and soft bras gained market share at the expense of underwire and padded bras, sometimes also serving as outerwear. Some bralettes have plunging designs, light padding or bottom support. In November 2016, the UK version of fashion magazine Vogue said "Cleavage is over"; this statement was widely criticized. Soft bras and sideboobs became popular over prominent cleavages. Soft bras comprised 30% of online retailer Net-a-Porter's bra sales by 2016. "Leisurée", a line of soft brassières that was inspired by contemporary athleisure style, was launched in 2016 and grew 300% year-on-year over the next two years. In 2017, the sales of cleavage-boosting bras fell by 45% while at Marks & Spencer, sales of wire-free bras grew by 40%.

Jess Cartner-Morley, fashion editor of The Guardian, reported in 2018 many women were dressing without bras, producing a less-dramatic cleavage, which she called "quiet cleavage". According to Sarah Shotton, creative director of Agent Provocateur, "Now it's about the athletic body, health and wellbeing" rather than the male gaze. According to lingerie designer Araks Yeramyan, "It was #MeToo that catapulted the bralette movement into what it is today". During the COVID-19 lockdowns, CNBC reported a drop of 12% in bra sales across 100 retailers while YouTubers made tutorials on re-purposing bras as face masks; this trend was sometimes called a "lockdown liberation".

Despite a long history, display of cleavage can still be controversial. UK women's magazine Stylist in 2017 and Indian newspaper Mid-Day in 2019 reported "cleavage shaming" was commonplace in news and social media. Female Bollywood actors Disha Patani, Deepika Padukone, Priyanka Chopra, Nargis Fakhri and others were trolled and shamed for wearing cleavage-baring outfits in social and new media, including newspaper Times of India. Extraordinary attention was generated when politicians Angela Merkel, Hillary Clinton and Jacqui Smith wore cleavage-revealing outfits even from media outlets The Washington Post and The New York Times.

As late as the 2010s, reports from Langley, British Columbia, Shreveport, Louisiana, Louisville, Kentucky, Reno, Nevada, Rockford, Illinois, Houston, Texas, Thunder Bay, Canada, Kerikeri, New Zealand and elsewhere showed female students, especially non-white students, had been expelled and banned from schools, and punished for wearing dresses that reveal cleavage and legs. At the same time, there also has been reports of passengers of airlines, including Southwest Airlines, Spirit Airlines and EasyJet, were instructed against and evicted for showing "too much cleavage". In 2014, a television series called The Empress of China was taken off-air in China days after its premier because of too much cleavage; the show was aired again after much censorship. In the next year, organizers of ChinaJoy, the largest gaming and digital entertainment exhibition held in China, levied a fine of US$800 on women who revealed "more than two centimeters of cleavage".

Public display of sideboob and underboob are legally regulated in some U.S. counties, and both were banned by CBS, which said "bare sides or under curvature of the breasts is also problematic" at the 55th Annual Grammy Awards in 2013. Underboob was banned in Springfield, Missouri in 2015 after a Free the Nipple rally. In 2016, Thailand banned selfies showing underboob with punishments of up to five years in jail. The video game-streaming platform Twitch banned underboobs and prescribed a permissible amount of cleavage in 2020.
