= AS Colour =

New Zealand apparel company

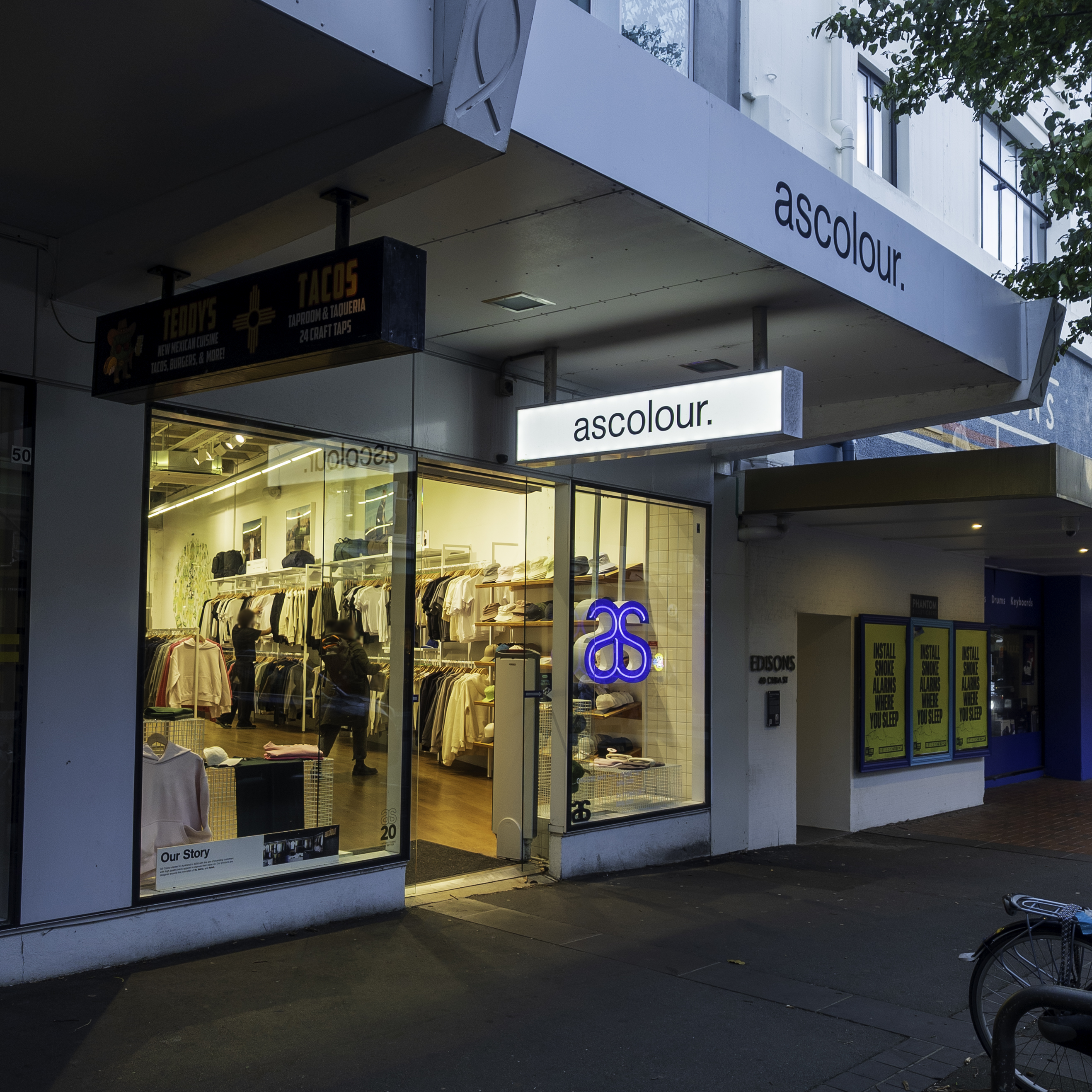
- AS Colour's retail store on Cuba Street, Wellington, New Zealand
- Type: Private
- Industry: Apparel
- Founded: 2005; 21 years ago in Parnell, New Zealand
- Founder: Lawrence Railton
- Headquarters: Auckland, New Zealand
- Number of locations: 28 stores (2026)
- Area served: Worldwide
- Operating income: Approx. NZ$500 million; (2025)
- Website: ascolour.com

AS Colour (short for "apparel studio") is a clothing retailer and manufacturer from New Zealand, specialising in blank apparel. While it operates 28 direct-to-consumer retail stores, the majority of its business is wholesale supply to screen-printers and embroiders.

AS Colour was founded in 2005 by Lawrence Railton, who initially operated the company from his garage in the Auckland suburb of Parnell. Railton was inspired to begin the company, after his friend from the band Elemeno P struggled to find high-quality blanks to use for screenprinting their concert T-shirts.

Railton initially imported 20,000 men's-style t-shirts to resell from American wholesaler All Style Apparel. The first AS Colour-designed and manufactured product was a women's-style t-shirt, sold alongside the imported men's t-shirts; by 2009, AS Colour was exclusively selling their own products.

By March 2026, the company had expanded to 16 retail stores in New Zealand and 12 worldwide, and operates from six distribution centres across New Zealand, Australia, the Netherlands, the UK and the US. The National Business Review estimates that by 2025, the company was valued at between NZ$1 – $1.5 billion, with annual sales of NZ$500 million.

Baptist World Aid Australia gave AS Colour a score of 65 (out of 100) in their 2024 Ethical Fashion Guide, placing them in the top 20% of brands assessed. The brand is supplied by 37 factories worldwide, with locations in Bangladesh, China, Mauritius, Thailand and Vietnam.

== See also ==
- Icebreaker
- Kathmandu
- List of lingerie brands
