= Sarda =

Sarda may refer to:

== Places and jurisdictions ==
- Sarda (Albanian Sardë), a ruined ancient town, on Shurdhah Island in northern Albania.
- The former Diocese of Sarda, now a Latin Catholic titular see
- Sarda river, a river which forms part of the border between India and Nepal

== People ==
- Andrés Sardá Sacristán (1929–2019), a Spanish fashion designer
- Felix Sardà y Salvany (1844–1916), a Spanish Catholic priest
- Har Bilas Sarda (1867–1955), an Indian academic, judge and politician
- Javier Sardà (born 1958), a Spanish journalist and TV presenter of Crónicas marcianas
- Rosa Maria Sardà (1941-2020), a Spanish actress and comedian

== Fiction ==
- Sarda the Sage, a character from the NES Final Fantasy, appearing in the webcomic 8-Bit Theater
- a Vulcan in the Dreadnought! Star Trek: The Original Series novel

== Things pertaining and names referring to Sardinia ==
- Sarda (cattle), a breed of small cattle
- Sarda (goat), a goat breed
- Sarda (fish), the bonitos, a fish genus
- Sarda (pig), a breed of domestic pig
- Sarda (sheep), a breed of domestic sheep
- Testudo marginata sarda, the Sardinian marginated tortoise, a reptile subspecies
- Classica Sarda Olbia-Pantogia, a road bicycle race held in Sardinia
- L'Unione Sarda, an Italian local daily newspaper, based in Cagliari, Italy
- Vendetta... sarda, a 1951 comedy film directed by Mario Mattoli

== Other ==
- Sarda Act, the colonial Child Marriage Restraint Act, enacted in British India in 1929
- Andrés Sardá, a Catalan Spanish lingerie brand
- USS Sarda (SS-488), a 1945 United States Navy Tench-class submarine
- a famous Marwari Maheshwari industrial house in Shekhawati, a semi-arid historical region located in the northeast part of Rajasthan, India
- Galia melon, a fruit also known as sarda
- SARDA : Andres Sarda, a Catalan Spanish lingerie brand has been rebranded in August 2024 and is now called SARDA
