= Jeremy Moon (entrepreneur) =

New Zealand businessman

Jeremy Moon MNZM
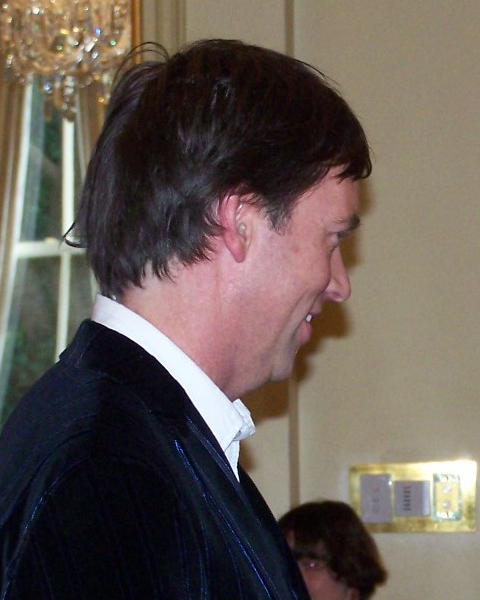
- Moon in 2008
- Born: Jeremy Ross Moon; 1969
- Occupations: Businessman; entrepreneur
- Years active: 1995–2018
- Known for: Founder of Icebreaker
- Spouse: Olivia Moon (married 2017-present)
- Relatives: Alexander McGeorge (great-grandfather)

Jeremy Ross Moon MNZM (born 1969) is a New Zealand businessman and entrepreneur who founded the clothing manufacturer Icebreaker in 1995. Moon used $25,000 to found the business, making garments from New Zealand merino wool.

Icebreaker was purchased by VF Corporation, a NYSE-listed entity, in 2018 for NZ$288 million. Moon received NZ$95 million from the sale.

In the 2008 Queen's Birthday Honours, Moon was appointed a Member of the New Zealand Order of Merit, for services to business.

Moon has served as judge for EY entrepreneur of the year, and DINZ Best Design Awards.
