= Alexander McGeorge =

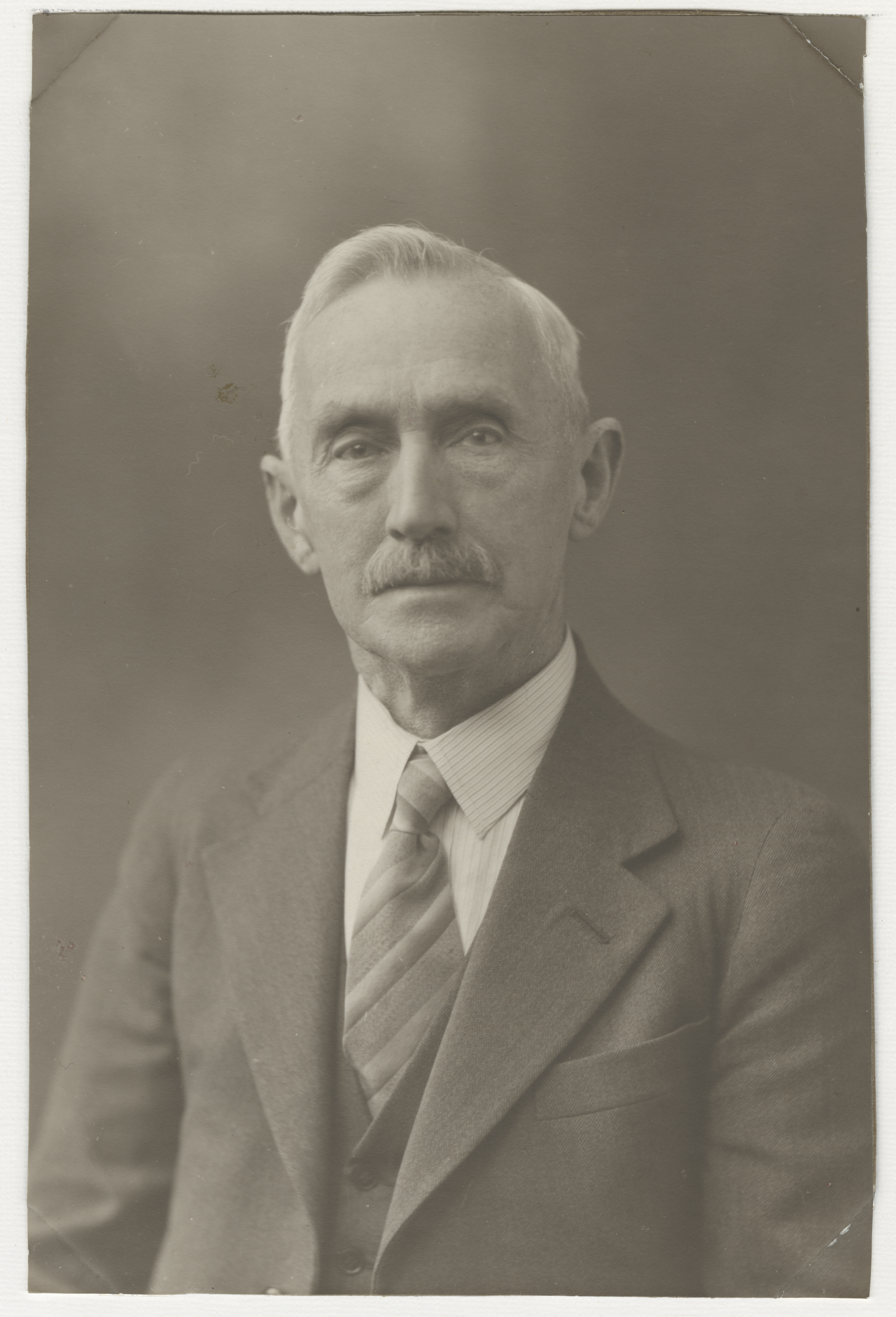
- McGeorge, c. 1936
- Born: Alexander Crow McGeorge; 4 August 1868; Dunedin, New Zealand
- Died: 14 January 1953 (aged 84); Karitane, New Zealand
- Other names: Alec McGeorge
- Known for: Gold dredging
- Relatives: Jeremy Moon (great-grandson)

Alexander Crow McGeorge (4 August 1868 – 14 January 1953) was a New Zealand engineer and gold dredging entrepreneur, contributing to the Otago gold rush of the 1890s.

== Biography ==
McGeorge was born in Dunedin on 4 August 1868 to Scottish parents, James McGeorge and Isabella Crow. McGeorge, along with his brothers John Crow and Joseph founded the Electric Gold Dredging Company in 1895, one of the most successful gold-dredging companies in New Zealand.

McGeorge's mother, Isabella Crow, and sister, Jane, were both signatories of the 1893 Women's Suffrage Petition.

The McGeorge brothers' most famous gold dredge was the Lady Ranfurly, named by the governor of New Zealand of the day, Uchter Knox, 5th Earl of Ranfurly, after his own wife on a visit to Cromwell on 12 March 1898.

McGeorge constructed the heritage residence "Kawarau", located at 204 Highgate in Dunedin. It was designed by the local architect Louis Salmond in 1900, and holds a "Historic Place Category 2" listing with Heritage New Zealand.

Alex McGeorge died in Karitane on 14 January 1953.

=== Relations ===
New Zealand entrepreneur Jeremy Moon is a great-grandson of McGeorge.
