= Cake Maternity =

Australian Maternity clothing brand

- Type: Private
- Industry: Fashion, Clothing, Lingerie
- Founded: 2008
- Headquarters: Sydney, Australia
- Key people: Tracey Montford
- Products: Maternity
- Brands: Cake Maternity, Rosewater & CupCake
- Website: cakematernity.com

Cake Maternity is an Australia-based maternity clothing brand, which specialises in nursing bras and other maternity products. Their products are designed to provide femininity like in mainstream lingerie and other clothing items, with the function required in maternity related products.

Cake Maternity was awarded the best UK Maternity brand in 2011 at the UK Lingerie Awards in Mayfair, London.

== History ==
Tracey Montford founded the company in 2008, following a pregnancy of her own. She felt that maternity bras that were available at the time were often poorly designed and had poor features. After researching the market, Montford created a range of maternity bras, before expanding into other maternity fields.

In 2012, the company founder was interviewed on The Morning Show on the Seven Network in Australia. Company founder Montford said during the interview that she focused on three areas when she started the brand. She wanted comfortable and attractive clothing that was also practical.

Cake Lingerie in 2014 won the Best Maternity Lingerie Brand at the Junior Design Awards, which was hosted by Junior Magazine.

In February 2015, a Cake Maternity model featured on the cover of Creations Lingerie magazine in their February/March edition of the magazine. The edition went on to question why so few mainstream retailers carried maternity lingerie. During the same month, the company featured on the front page of the British magazine, Gurgle.

== Products ==
The company offers a range of products from maternity lingerie, essential maternity items to maternity nightwear.

Made for Mums in 2010 stated that their bras were one of the 10 of the best products for breastfeeding. The bras featured on The Morning Show were part of the My Bust range of nursing bras, stating that the bras are designed differently, depending on the cup size of the woman wearing the bra. The B to D Cup is designed in a plunge style and the D to G cup bra is designed in a balcony style. The products demonstrated on the show were nursing bras with drop down cups and extra sling extra support. It was also stated that all bras come with a number of hooks and eyes, allowing the bra to be adapted during a pregnancy as the woman's stomach grows.

Cake Maternity also produces a range of nightwear clothing. The nightwear tops provide drop down cups from the straps for added functionality.

Cupcake Nursing Pads were first introduced in 2014. Omaha Family Magazine stated that the Cupcake Nursing Pads were the only nursing pads on the market that were adaptable for low, medium and heavy milk flow absorption. This can be achieved by adding in or removing liners.

== UK Lingerie Awards ==
The company's most notable achievement came in 2011, when they were part of the inaugural UK Lingerie Awards. The event was held in Mayfair, London. The company went on to win the award for best maternity lingerie brand.

Cake Maternity went on to be finalists in the same category for the following three years in 2012, 2013 and 2014 at the awards.
