= Andrés Sardá Sacristán =

Spanish fashion designer (1929–2019)

- Born: 1929; Barcelona, Spain
- Died: 15 September 2019 (aged 89–90); Barcelona, Spain
- Occupation: Fashion designer
- Children: 1

Andrés Sardá Sacristán (1929 – 15 September 2019) was a Spanish textile engineer, fashion designer, and creator of the lingerie brand Andrés Sardá.

== Early life ==
He was born into a family that had been dedicated to the Catalan textile industry since the 19th century. After finishing his engineering studies, Sardá joined the family business. One of Sardá's first tasks was to introduce its products into the United States.

In 1962, he founded his own firm, which was dedicated to the design and production of women's lingerie and later expanded into swimwear. He is known for being the first designer to incorporate elastic fibers into their designs.

The firm currently has collections under three brands: Andrés Sardá, Risk, and University. His daughter, Nuria Sardá, is also a collaborator with his company.

He died on 15 September 2019, in Barcelona, at the age of 90. In December 2020, he was awarded the Gold Medal for Merit in Fine Arts posthumously. In 2024, his eponymous lingerie company was renamed 'Sarda'.
