= Lembrassa =

British lingerie and swimwear retailer

- Type: Retailer (online only)
- Industry: Apparel
- Founded: 2008; 18 years ago
- Founder: Laura Cohen
- Headquarters: UK
- Products: Bras, panties, lingerie, swimwear, innerwear

Lembrassa was a British lingerie and swimwear retailer founded in 2008 by Laura Cohen specifically to cater to women with larger breasts (D–J cup size).

The debate over the "size zero" image and catwalk models heated up with the announcement by Lynne Featherstone, the equalities minister, that she planned to convene a series of discussions in Autumn 2010 with the fashion industry, to discuss how to promote body confidence among young people. This received much press coverage (e.g. Fashion industry faces airbrushing clampdown) and re-opened the debate about the treatment of "real women" and the hero worship of "size zero" catwalk models.

Lembrassa founder, Laura Cohen, encountered the "real women" versus "size zero" issues before they became a popular movement and determined to do something about it. She started the company because in her own words "I was fed up with the treatment I was getting when trying to buy larger cup size lingerie in store or even online. I felt frustrated with the high street retailers who were continually being 'out of stock' of my size."

As well as founding Lembrassa, Laura has written a number of published articles on the issues facing larger-busted women including guidance on getting the right size bra when 80% of women get it wrong.

Lembrassa follows its founder's belief in open marketplaces by having a single worldwide website and a single set of pricing. Customers from all over the world can purchase at the same sterling price. This approach is underlined by another of the founder's articles "The world is you local shop".

Lembrassa has attracted media interest for the difficulties small businesses face in getting start-up support "Lembrassa aims for perfect fit" and for its attention to customer service "Frustration at Shop Ranges".
