= Zimmerli of Switzerland =

Swiss luxury underwear brand

Zimmerli Textil AG
- Trade name: Zimmerli of Switzerland
- Industry: Fashion
- Founded: 1871
- Founder: Pauline Zimmerli-Bäurlin
- Headquarters: Switzerland, Zurich
- Products: Clothing
- Website: www.zimmerli.com

Zimmerli of Switzerland is a Swiss luxury underwear brand founded in 1871.

== History ==
=== Founding and development ===
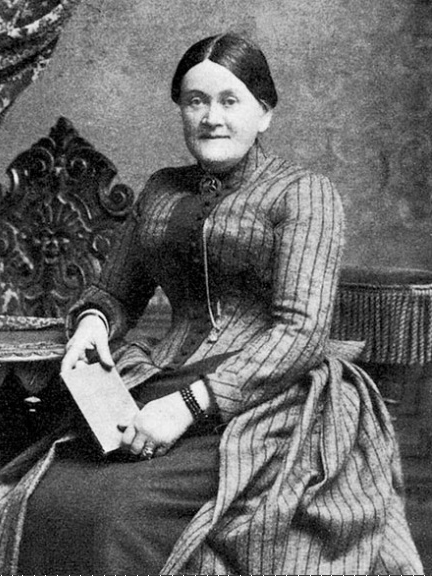
Pauline Zimmerli-Bäurlin, the brand's founder.

Zimmerli was founded in Aarburg in 1871 by seamstress and needlework teacher Pauline Zimmerli-Bäurlin (1829–1914). Ida Pauline Bäurlin was born in Aarau, Switzerland, on 7 July 1829, the daughter of Samuel Bäurlin, a government secretary, and Luise Hässig. In 1859 she married Johann Jakob Zimmerli, a businessman in the red dye industry and a widower who already had six children from his first marriage.

After her husband's business went bankrupt in 1871 due to the introduction of aniline dyes, he read a newspaper article about a new knitting machine invented in the United States by Isaac William Lamb. He then sent his wife to Basel, where she was trained by Lamb's agents.

The company manufactured high-quality women's stockings and men's hosiery and underwear using Lamb's cutting machines. Her business soon proved successful: she was joined by her son Oscar and her stepson Adolf, and new employees had to be recruited by 1874. Pauline invented a new knitting machine, and sent her plans and ideas to the USA. In the same year, Zimmerli received the first double-needle knitting machine in Switzerland, which allowed for the production of ribbed fabrics and underwear, laying the foundations for an entirely new industrial sector. From 1878 Zimmerli's garments were sold in Parisian department store Le Bon Marché, and the brand attracted an increasing number of customers in the USA.

In 1888 her son Oscar (1860–1928) acquired his stepbrother Adolf's shares and transformed Zimmerli into a public limited company. The brand won the gold medal at the 1889 Paris Exposition, and another gold medal and Grand Prix at the 1900 Paris Exposition. Zimmerli won another gold medal at the 1910 Brussels Exposition. Zimmerli's founder Pauline Zimmerli-Bäurlin died in Aarburg on 8 May 1914.

=== 1920 to 1992 ===
In 1920 the company passed into other hands. After economic difficulties in the 1920s, Zimmerli eventually recovered and took a new direction with extra-fine underwear for men and women.

In 1965 the company acquired a production facility in Coldrerio, in the canton of Ticino. After this, Zimmerli started to also produce for licensors and, like many textile manufacturers, fell into crisis.

=== 1992 to present ===
In 1992, the Zimmerli Coldrerio SA production facility was acquired by cousins Walter and Hans Borner, followed by Zimmerli Textil AG in 1997. They started to reorganise the company, terminating all licenses and concentrating on men's underwear. After a decade of stagnation, Zimmerli launched a new women's underwear line in 1998, which was well received internationally. In 2006, Walter Borner was named Swiss Entrepreneur of the Year.

In 2007 the company was acquired by Nordeck International Holding, owned by the heirs of biscuit manufacturer Bahlsen. They hired Marcel Hossli, a manager who previously worked at Patek Philippe. The new management's goal was to transform the brand from a premium into an international luxury brand. As part of this strategy, a flagship store in Rue Saint Honoré in Paris and a shop-in-shop at KadeWe Berlin were opened in 2012.

Part of Zimmerli garments are still made in Switzerland, by Zimmerli-owned mill in Mendrisio, and by subcontractors E. Schellenberg AG in Fehraltorf and Textil AG in Huttwil.

== Popular culture ==
Zimmerli underwear were worn by Sylvester Stallone in the movie Rocky (1976), Keanu Reeves in The Matrix (1999), Halle Berry in Gothika (2003), Jamie Foxx in Ray (2004), Joaquin Phoenix inWalk the Line (2005), and Hugh Jackman in The Wolverine (2013).

== Bibliography ==
- Bergmann, Jens (2022). Unterscheide dich!: Markengeschichten von Abt bis Zwilling. brand eins Medien. ISBN 978-3-949712-10-4.
- Uhl, Axel; Loretan, Stephan (2019). Digitalisierung in der Praxis: So schaffen KMU den Weg in die Zukunft. Springer-Verlag. p. 96. ISBN 978-3-658-26137-5.
- Zehnder, Patrick (2017). "Ida Pauline Zimmerli-Bäurlin". Historisches Lexikon der Schweiz.
