= Splendrillia sarda =

Scientific classification
- Kingdom: Animalia
- Phylum: Mollusca
- Class: Gastropoda
- Subclass: Caenogastropoda
- Order: Neogastropoda
- Superfamily: Conoidea
- Family: Drilliidae
- Genus: Splendrillia
- Species: S. sarda

Binomial name
- Splendrillia sarda Kilburn, 1988

Species of gastropod

Splendrillia sarda is a species of sea snail, a marine gastropod mollusk in the family Drilliidae.

== Description ==
The small, brownish-orange to yellowish, claviform shell has a length of 9.2 mm, its diameter 3.7 mm. The smooth protoconch is small (height about 0.8 mm) and consists of 1½ whorl, the teleoconch contains 5½ whorls.. The axial ribs are strong (with 9-11 ribs on the penultimate whorl). The body whorl has an inverted cone shape and its dorsum is not prominently humped and with a low and distinct varix. The short siphonal canal is relatively wide and twisted slightly to the right. The aperture is narrowly pear-shaped. The outer lip is somewhat flattened in the middle. The base of the columella is strongly curved to the left.

== Distribution ==
This marine species occurs off the upper continental slope of Transkei, South Africa.
