= Lise Charmel =

Lingerie manufacturer

Lise Charmel is a manufacturer and distributor of lingerie in Lyon, France. As one of the largest producers of French lingerie. Lise Charmel is known for French luxury lingerie.
