= Kestos =

British lingerie brand (1925–1967)

Kestos is a British lingerie brand founded in London in 1925 by British designer Rosamund Lilian Klin, (1899-1949) the wife of a Russian artist living in London. Kestos' major innovation to the feminine underwear in the 1930s was the development of the two separate cups model. Rosamund Klin, director of the Kestos Corset Company, started experimenting with a pair of hankies, just like Caresse Crosby back in 1913. Kestos' bra was the first commercially produced brassiere that had two distinct and defined cups and "the Kestos" became a generic trademark bra. Kestos was distributed in the US, UK, Canada, Australia, France as well as some other European countries and was popular through the 1930s, 1940s and into the early 1950s. The company went into liquidation in 1967 prior to the death of the Chairman Leo Klin (1877-1967).

== Bibliography ==
- Uplift: The Bra in America, Jane Farrell-Beck, Colleen Gau, University of Pennsylvania Press, 2002 - Health & Fitness - 264 pages
- The Garden Book, Brian Castro, Giramondo Publishing, May 1, 2005 - Fiction - 324 pages
- The encyclopaedia of fashion, Georgina O'Hara Callan, H.N. Abrams, Oct 1, 1986 - Design - 272 pages
- The Story of Lingerie, Muriel Barbier, Shazia Boucher, Parkstone International, May 8, 2012 - Design - 272 pages
