= Formfit =

The Formfit Company was a manufacturer of women's "foundation garments", mainly corsets and girdles. Founded in 1917 with headquarters in Chicago, Illinois, Formfit later became known for other types of lingerie, particularly bras and briefs.

== History ==
Founded in 1917, the company's headquarters housed manufacturing, shipping and sales in a single building. They also had facilities in nearby Aurora, Illinois.

In the early 1960s, Formfit merged with Rogers lingerie, to make Formfit-Rogers. In this era, the label enjoyed a renaissance of sorts, producing intimate garments and gowns designed by Italian fashion designer Emilio Pucci.

In the 1970s Formfit-Rogers was acquired by New York-based apparel holding company, I. Appel Corp., run by New York businessman, Norman Katz. Under I. Appel, Formfit-Rogers built on its reputation as a premium market intimate apparel label, from its Emilio Pucci days.

In the late 1980s, like other I. Appel labels, Formfit's manufacturing was relocated to Mexico. Its quality control suffered, and many department stores dropped the line. This, combined with the rise of Victoria's Secret, saw Formfit-Rogers brand fall into decline (along with many other intimate apparel brands).

The "seamless panties" line of Formfit was acquired in 1997 by Jockey International and sold under the label "Form-Fit".

Many other brands have used the hyphenated word "Form-Fit" to describe various underwear lines. The term "Form-Fit" is not exclusive to the brand "Formfit" and has sometimes caused brand confusion.

The rights to the Formfit-Rogers name are currently held by Colombia-based Ingresar Apparel Company.
