= Vedette Shapewear =

American manufacturer of women's undergarments

Vedette
- Company type: Private
- Founded: Tuluá, Colombia (1983)
- Headquarters: Williamson, Georgia
- Website: www.vedettestore.com

Vedette is a company, headquartered in Williamson, Georgia, that manufactures and markets undergarments for women, with an emphasis on shapewear undergarments which are functionally designed to help wearers achieve a desired body form for aesthetic purposes, but can also be used as post-surgical support or to encourage posture discipline. Vedette markets its products towards more affluent consumers by using more costly materials, focusing on detailed design and appearance in addition to function, and borrowing design elements from intimates, lingerie, and traditional corsets. Vedette also maintains a standard lower-cost product line and a few products for men.

== Company and divisions ==
The Vedette brand currently employs around 300 to 350 employees at several locations around the globe, operating under various localized company names:

- United States: Orion Manufacturing, Inc. operates as the global headquarters in Williamson, Georgia and is mainly responsible for international sales and international shipping to all destinations except Colombia.
- Colombia: C.I. Inducorset operates as the regional headquarters in Tuluá, and is responsible for international sales in Spanish speaking markets and shipping within Colombia. Vedette's main factory, responsible for final garment assembly, also operates in Tuluá, employing local labor. Vedette operates two retail stores in Colombia, in Bogotá and in Tuluá.
- Mexico: A retail store location and a smaller factory responsible for manufacturing some precursor parts operates in Mexico City.
- Philippines: SEA Global CC operates as the regional headquarters in Makati, and is responsible for international sales in English.

== Sales ==
Vedette's annual sales have grown at an average of 25% to 30% per year, with annual sales totaling nearly $9 million in 2008.

== History ==
Vedette was founded in 1979 in Tuluá, Colombia. After growing quickly in its home country and spreading throughout South and Central America, Vedette expanded into the United States in 1998: first to Texas, then to Florida, and finally to Georgia to serve the emerging shapewear market in the United States, concentrating on the Hispanic community. Vedette has since grown to serve a much greater variety of international and domestic clients with increasing focus on Internet sales.
