= Andrés Sardá =

Spanish lingerie brand

- Industry: Apparel
- Products: Hosiery, bras, panties, and lingerie
- Website: https://www.sardaworld.com

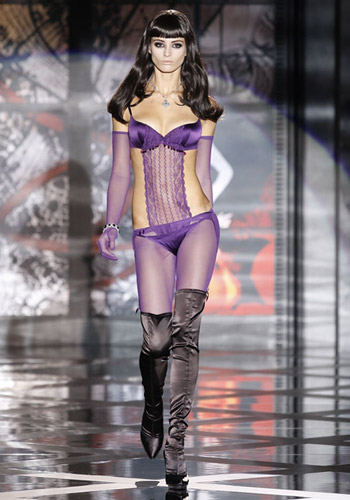
Andrés Sardá model.

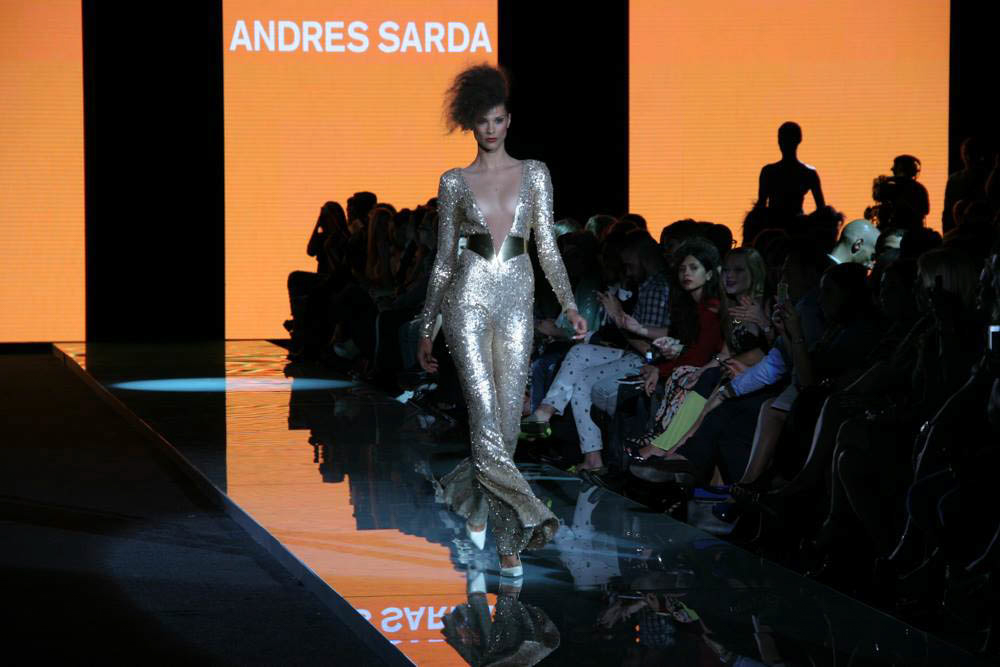
Model walks down the runway in a fashion show wearing a design by Andres Sarda during the Miami Fashion Week

Andrés Sardá is a Spanish lingerie brand created by Andrés Sardá Sacristán. Today, Sarda's daughter, Nuria Sardá, is creative director of the brand. The brand has a store located in Madrid, on Don Ramon de la Cruz Street, and over 400 multi-brand points of sale, with a greater presence in Germany, Belgium, Spain and France.

Andres Sardá designs are known internationally for having contributed to the field of lingerie technology with the innovation of adding Teflon, Nylon, and Lycra to his products.

Since 2000, Andrés Sardá designs are present in the Pasarela Cibeles, and, previously in 1996, at the Pasarela Gaudi.

== History ==
The company was founded in 1962 by Andres Sardá and the brand in 1980. At the time of the creation of the company, the pieces of underwear were made with an almost sole focus of orthopedic functional criteria, regardless of aesthetics. In 1965, Sardá began exports to France with clients such as Galeries Lafayette and Printemps.

In 1970, Sardá expanded the range of products by adding swimming clothes. In 1995, Nuria Sardá, his daughter, who was the manager of the prestigious Eurocorset boutique, joined the design team led by Andrés Sardá. Currently, she is in charge of creative direction.

The group Van de Velde N.V. bought Eurocorset SA, owner of the trademark Andrés Sardá, with the agreement that the family Sardá would still create the collections and would keep the headquarters of operations in Barcelona.

In 2024, the brand was renamed 'Sarda'.
