= List of De Montfort University people =

This is a list of people associated with De Montfort University. This includes De Montfort University alumni, those who have taught there, conducted research there or played a part in its founding.

== Notable academics ==
- Julia Briggs, literary critic and biographer
- Gavin Bryars, composer
- James Stevens Curl, architectural historian, architect and author
- Gary Day
- Christopher Duffy
- Simon Emmerson, composer
- David Greenaway, economist
- Ian Hall
- Robert Hewison
- Christopher Hobbs
- Derek Hockridge
- John Hoskin
- Andrew Hugill
- Colin Jones, artist
- Chris Joseph, writer
- Joanna Scanlan, actress
- Stephen Thomas Knight
- Leigh Landy
- Jim Marshall
- Nicholas J. Phillips
- Kate Pullinger
- John Richards, musician
- Martin Rieser
- Michael Scott
- Debbie Sell
- Dave Smith, composer
- Sue Thomas, author
- John Young, composer
- Lala Meredith-Vula

== Notable alumni ==
=== Academics ===
- Louis de Bernières, novelist
- Mohd Sapuan Salit, professor of material science at Universiti Putra Malaysia
- Michael Scott, is the current vice-chancellor of Glyndŵr University in Wrexham, Wales.

=== Business ===
- Nicola Pellow, co-designer of the WWW
- Kingsley Pungong, Sports
- Ken Shuttleworth, architect

=== Fashion ===
- Nichole de Carle, lingerie designer
- Laura Coleman, model, Miss England 2008
- Liam Fahy, footwear designer
- Karolina Laskowska, lingerie designer
- Janet Reger, lingerie designer
- Samuel Ross, fashion designer, founder of A-COLD-WALL*

=== Health and medicine ===
- Allen Lloyd, pharmacist and founder of LloydsPharmacy
- Vijay Patel, pharmacist and founder of Waymade Plc.
- Debbie Sell, speech and language pathology therapist

=== Artists, entertainers and journalists ===
- John "TotalBiscuit" Bain, game commentator
- John Buckley, sculptor
- Audrey Barker, artist
- Zarina Bhimji, photographer and filmmaker
- Justin Chadwick, actor, television and film director
- JS Clayden, vocalist for Pitchshifter, founder of PSI Records
- Helen Mary Coaton, sculptor
- Marverine Cole, radio and television presenter
- Dorothy Cross, artist and sculptor
- Charles Dance, actor
- Pete Donaldson, broadcaster
- Keeley Donovan, broadcaster
- Alun Evans, journalist, CEO of Football Association of Wales
- Mike Foyle, music producer
- Christian Furr, artist
- MJ Hibbett, singer-songwriter
- Sarah Keyworth, comedian
- Akram Khan, dancer
- Victor Kunda, internet personality and model
- Jemisha Maadhavji, painter
- Nero, music producer
- Jamie-Lee O'Donnell, actor
- QBoy, rapper and producer
- Simon Rimmer, chef and television presenter
- Nick Ruston, artist and sculptor
- David Shrigley, artist
- Simon Wells, film director
- Ian Willcock, composer

=== Law ===
- Michael Beloff, barrister (honorary degree)
- Geoffrey Bindman, human rights lawyer (honorary degree)
- John Geoffrey Jones, judge, president of the Mental Health Review Tribunal for England and Wales (honorary degree)
- Helena Kennedy, Baroness Kennedy of The Shaws, barrister, broadcaster, and Labour member of the House of Lords (honorary degree)

=== Politics and government ===
- Simba Makoni, Zimbabwean politician, former minister of finance and economic development (2000–2002)
- Neo Masisi, First Lady of Botswana
- Margot Parker, UK Independence Party MEP
- Shivani Raja, British Conservative Party politician, MP for Leicester East
- Andy Reed, former Labour Party MP for Loughborough
- Dean Russell, British Conservative Party Politician, MP for Watford
- Angela Smith, former British Labour Party politician MP for Basildon
- Sir Peter Soulsby, British Labour Party politician and Mayor of Leicester
- David Taylor, British Labour Party politician, MP for North West Leicestershire
- Claudia Webbe, British politician, former MP for Leicester East

=== Sport ===
- MS Dhoni, Indian Cricketer and only captain in the world who has won 3 ICC trophies ( 2007 T20 world cup, 2011 Cricket World Cup, 2013 ICC Champions Trophy)
- Harry Ellis, England Rugby Union international
- Eddie the Eagle, ski jumper
- Kim Joo-Sung, Korean international footballer
- Lewis Moody, England rugby union captain
- Geordan Murphy, Ireland rugby union international, director of rugby for Leicester Tigers
- Park Ji-sung, Korean International footballer
- Budge Pountney, Scotland rugby union international, director of rugby for Northampton Saints
- Emma Twigg, Olympic Rower for New Zealand
