= UK Lingerie Awards =

Annual British fashion awards ceremony

UK Lingerie Awards 2012 Logo

The UK Lingerie Awards were held annually in the United Kingdom to present awards to key individuals from the British lingerie industry, including designers and retailers. The awards were organized by the lingerie industry magazine Lingerie Insight. The awards were discontinued after their last ceremony in 2015 and have been succeeded by Stars Undelines Best Shop Awards which are still active and continue to hold annual ceremonies, including a scheduled 2026 event.

== 2011 Awards ==
The inaugural event was held in September 2011 at One Mayfair, London.

The awards were decided by a panel of 7 judges from the lingerie industry before the night. They were: Nichole de Carle (Lingerie designer), Claire Franks (Intimate Apparel Consultancy), Kelly Isaac (The Lingerie Collective), June Kenton (Rigby & Peller), Gillian Proctor (De Montfort University), Kat Slowe (Lingerie Insight) and Sharon Webb (Debenhams).

20 awards were handed out during the ceremony with several receiving more than one nomination. Lingerie Brands Curvy Kate and Lascivious received 3 nominations with La Perla, Obey My Demand and Triumph receiving 2 nominations. Retailers Debenhams and La Senza also received 2 nominations but no brand or retailer won more than one award on the night. The winners and finalists for each category were as follows:

| Category | Winner | Finalists |
|---|---|---|
| Lingerie Brand | La Perla | Curvy Kate and Triumph |
| Multiple Retailer | Agent Provocateur | Bravissimo and La Senza |
| Online Retailer | Figleaves | Fox & Rose and Glamorous Amorous |
| Marketing Campaign | La Senza | Curvy Kate and Lascivious |
| Department Store | Selfridges | Debenhams and John Lewis |
| Full Bust Brand | Curvy Kate | Gorgeous by Debenhams and Miss Mandalay |
| Hosiery Brand | Wolford | Jonathan Aston and Pretty Polly |
| Independent Directional Brand | Lascivious | Bordelle and Nichole de Carle |
| Independent Retailer | Rigby & Peller | Sadie the Bra Lady and The Lingerie Collective |
| Maternity Brand | Cake Lingerie | HOTmilk and Royce Maternity |
| New Designer | Obey My Demand | Nicole Gill and Paolita |
| Post Surgery Brand | Jamu Australia | Anita and Royce Lingerie |
| Shapewear Brand | Made by Niki | Flexees and Spanx |
| Sports Bra Brand | Shock Absorber | Freya Active and Triumph Sports |
| Swimwear Brand | Maryan Mehlhorn | Melissa Odabash and Seafolly |
| Lifetime Achievement Award | Jill Kenton | |
| Most Innovative Brand | Atsuko Kudo | Lascivious and Obey My Demand |
| Bridal Brand | Myla | La Perla and Lise Charmel |
| Ethical Brand | Sweetling Lingerie | G=9.8 and Whomadeyourpants? |
| Men's Brand | Calvin Klein | 2(x)ist and Emporio Armani |

== 2012 Awards ==
The 2012 ceremony took place in September 2012 at One Mayfair again. The judging panel for 2012 consists of 9 industry figures, 4 return from the 2011 panel: Claire Franks (Intimate Apparel Consultancy), Kelly Issac (Lingerie Collective), Gillian Proctor (De Montfort University) and Sharon Webb (Debenhams). The 5 new judges are Paul Ager (UK Fashion & Textile Association), Helen Attwood (Selfridges), Michele Duncan (Invista), Joanna Holmes (Shop Direct Group) and Barbara Horspool (New Look).

20 awards were handed out during the night. 3 awards were dropped, the Bridal, Ethical and Men's Brands categories and 3 new awards were added, "Favourite British Lingerie Designer", "Favourite Retailer" and "Favourite Lingerie Brand". These 3 were voted for by the public not by the judging panel. Lingerie brands Curvy Kate and Dirty Pretty Things received 4 nominations whilst 7 other brands had 2 (Freya, Kiss Me Deadly, La Perla, Made by Niki, Myla, Panache and Paolita). 3 retailers also received 2 nominations, Betty & Belle, Debenhams and Figleaves. The winners and finalists for each category are as follows:

| Category | Winner | Finalists |
|---|---|---|
| Lingerie Brand | Myla | Curvy Kate, La Perla, Mimi Holliday |
| Multiple Retailer | Rigby & Peller | Agent Provocateur, Ann Summers, Boux Avenue |
| Online Retailer | Figleaves | Fox & Rose, Lascivious, Lingerie Please |
| Marketing Campaign | Curvy Kate | Lingerie Love Bomb, Wonderbra, Panache Sports |
| Department Store | Selfridges | Debenhams, Harrods, John Lewis |
| Full Bust Brand | Curvy Kate | Freya, Miss Mandalay, Prima Donna |
| Hosiery Brand | Jonathan Aston | Bebaroque, Charnos, Wolford |
| Independent Directional Brand | Made by Niki | Bordelle, Fred and Ginger, Kiss Me Deadly |
| Independent Retailer | Dolci Follie | Betty and Belle, The Lingerie Collective, Playful Promises |
| Maternity Brand | HOTmilk | Bravado, Cake Lingerie, Lorna Drew |
| New Designer | Dirty Pretty Things | Nicole Gill, Paolita, Tatu Couture |
| Post Surgery Brand | Jamu Australia | Anita, Royce Lingerie, Serita |
| Shapewear Brand | Spanx | Maidenform, Miraclesuit, Resultwear |
| Sports Bra Brand | Panache Sports | Berlei, Freya Active, Shock Absorber |
| Swimwear Brand | Pistol Panties | La Perla, Paolita, Seafolly |
| Lifetime Achievement Award | Theo Paphetis | |
| Most Innovative Brand | Made by Niki | Dirty Pretty Things, Marlies Dekkers, Sweetling Lingerie |
| Favourite British Designer | Kiss Me Deadly | Dirty Pretty Things, Myla, Stella McCartney |
| Favourite Retailer | Debenhams | Betty and Belle, Bravissimo, Figleaves |
| Favourite Lingerie Brand | Gossard | Curvy Kate, Dirty Pretty Things, Tallulah Love |

== 2013 Awards ==
The winners for the 2013 awards are as follows:

| Category | Winner | Finalists |
|---|---|---|
| Lingerie Brand | Gossard | Chantelle, Fleur of England, Fred & Ginger |
| Multiple Retailer | Rigby & Peller | Boux Avenue, Bravissimo, Intimissimi |
| Online Retailer | Figleaves | ASOS, Fleur of England, Net-a-Porter |
| Marketing Campaign | Freya Deco 365 | Bo Peeps, Curvy Kate, Lascivious |
| Department Store | Selfridges | Debenhams, Harvey Nichols, John Lewis |
| Fuller Bust Brand | Elomi | Curvy Kate, Fantasie, Panache |
| Hosiery Brand | Jonathan Aston | Andrea Bucci, Charnos, Oroblu |
| Independent Directional Brand | Something Wicked | Belle et BonBon, Dirty Pretty Things, Fleur of England, Made by Niki |
| Independent Retailer | Dolci Follie | Boudoir Lingerie, Boutique65, Coco De Mer, Guilt Lingerie |
| Maternity Brand | Lorna Drew | Bravado, Cake Lingerie, Hotmilk |
| New Designer | Madame Supertrash | Belle et BonBon, Shell Belle Couture, Something Wicked |
| Post Surgery Brand | Anita Care | Amoena, Jamu Australia, Nicola Jane |
| Shapewear Brand | Spanx | Fit Britches, La Figurelle, Maidenform, Wolford |
| Sports Bra Brand | Panache Sport | Berlei, Freya Active, Shock Absorber |
| Swimwear Brand | Pistol Panties | Aguaclara, OYE Swimwear, Paolita |
| Lifetime Achievement Award | Gillian Proctor | |
| Favourite British Designer | Janet Reger | Kiss Me Deadly, Olivia Von Halle, Stella McCartney |
| Favourite Retailer | Debenhams | Agent Provocateur, Bravissimo, Rigby & Peller |
| Favourite Lingerie Brand | Gossard | Curvy Kate, Kiss Me Deadly, Maison Close |
| Boudoir Lingerie Brand | Maison Close | Madame Supertrash, Myla, Something Wicked |
| Lounge and Nightwear Brand | Olivia von Halle | Ayten Gasson, Eberjey, Shell Belle Couture |
| Regional Department Store | Jarrold | Beales, Bentalls, Browns |

== 2014 Awards ==
The winners for the 2014 awards are as follows:

| Category | Winner | Finalists |
|---|---|---|
| Lingerie Brand | Chantelle | Charnos, Gossard, Huit |
| Multiple Retailer | F&F | Rigby & Peller, Bravissimo |
| Online Retailer | Simply Beach | Coco Bay, Figleaves, Fox & Rose |
| Marketing Campaign | Curvy Kate | Debenhams, Panache, Made by Nikki, Wolford |
| Department Store | Debenhams | House of Fraser, Selfridges, Fenwick |
| Full Bust Brand | Harlow & Fox | Fantasie, Gorgeous at Debenhams, Curvy Kate, Freya |
| Hosiery Brand | Wolford | Leg Avenue, Ballerina, Jonathan Aston, Pretty Polly |
| Independent Directional Brand | Belle et BonBon | Reckless Wolf, Bordelle, Vevie |
| Independent Retailer | Coco de Mer | Odyssey Boutique, Caroline Randell Lingerie Boutique, Dolci Follie |
| Maternity Brand | Lorna Drew | Elle Macpherson Intimates, Cake Lingerie, Anita Maternity |
| New Designer | Karolina Laskowska | Holland Street, Sumarie, Vevie, Meng |
| Post Surgery Brand | Vanilla Blush | Nicola Jane, Jamu Australia, Royce |
| Shapewear Brand | Wolford | Vercella Vita, Naomi & Nicole, Spanx |
| Sports Bra Brand | Freya Active | Royce, Panache, Berlei |
| Swimwear Brand | Melissa Odabash | Pistol Panties, Maryan Mehlhorn, Nicole de Carle |
| Lifetime Achievement Award | Jacqueline Gold | |
| Favourite British Designer | Ultimo | Stella McCartney, Janet Reger, Fleur of England, Kiss Me Deadly |
| Favourite Retailer | Debenhams | Figleaves, Agent Provocateur, Asos, Rigby & Peller |
| Favourite Lingerie Brand | Gossard | Curvy Kate, Freya, Lepel, Panache |
| Boudoir Lingerie Brand | Belle et BonBon | Bordelle, Bluebella, Maison Close |
| Lounge and Nightwear Brand | Shell Belle Couture | Meng, Olivia Von Halle, Gilda & Pearl |

== 2015 Awards ==
| Category | Winner | Finalists |
|---|---|---|
| Online Retailer | Figleaves | Belle Lingerie, JD Williams, Love Honey |
| Favorite Retailer | Debenhams | |
| Favorite Brand | Gossard | |

== See also ==
- List of fashion awards
