= Charles Noskwith =

British hosiery manufacturer (1888–1952)

Charles Henry Noskwith (1888–1952) was a British hosiery manufacturer. He founded Charnos in Ilkeston, England in 1935.

== Biography ==
He was born Chaim Noskowitz in Łódź, Poland. He married Malka Ginsberg, a fellow Jew, and together they owned a textile business in Chemnitz, Germany. They emigrated to England in 1932, and started a textile business in Ilkeston, Derbyshire. The company name was derived from his Anglicised name Charles Noskwith.

Their son Rolf Noskwith, who was a Bletchley Park cryptographer during the war, joined the company in 1946, and took over when his father died in 1952.
