= Gary Day =

Gary Day may refer to:

- Gary Day (actor) (born 1941), New Zealand Australian actor
- Gary Day (musician) (born 1965), British bass guitarist
- Gary Day (politician), Pennsylvania State Representative for the 187th district
- Gary Day (academic), British academic
