= Bravissimo =

Bravissimo may refer to:

- Bravissimo (film), a 1955 Italian film
- Bravissimo (company), a British lingerie company
- Fiat Bravissimo, the Japanese name for the Fiat Bravo/Brava
