= Ruston =

Ruston may refer to:

== Place names ==
=== United States ===
- Ruston, Louisiana
- Ruston, Washington

=== United Kingdom ===
- East Ruston, Norfolk, England
- Ruston, North Yorkshire, England
- Ruston Parva, East Riding of Yorkshire, England

== Companies ==
- Ruston (engine builder) (or Ruston, Proctor and Company), railway locomotive and industrial equipment manufacturer in Lincoln, England
  - Ruston & Hornsby, descendant of Ruston, Proctor & Co.
  - Ruston-Bucyrus, manufacturer of steam shovels and cranes

== People ==
=== Given name ===
- Ruston Kelly, American musician and songwriter
- Ruston Webster, NFL general manager

=== Surname ===
- Abigail Ruston, American shot putter
- Anne Ruston, Australian politician
- Audrey Hepburn (born Audrey Kathleen Ruston), Belgian-born British actress
- John Ruston (bishop), South African Anglican bishop
- Joseph Ruston, English engineer and politician
- Kirra Ruston (born 1998), Australian professional boxer
- Nicolas Ruston, English artist
- Dick Ruston, Canadian politician

== Other ==
- Camp Ruston, American prisoner of war camp
- Ruston Way Park, park in Tacoma, Washington, United States

== See also ==
- Rustin (disambiguation)
