= Scheldt =

River in France, Belgium and the Netherlands

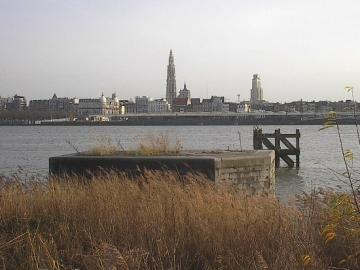
- The Scheldt in Antwerp
- Native name: Escaut (French); Schelde (Dutch)

Location
- Countries: France; Belgium; Netherlands

Physical characteristics
- Source
  - location: France
  - elevation: 97 m (318 ft)
- Mouth
  - location: North Sea
  - coordinates: 51°25′51″N 3°31′44″E
- Length: 360 km (220 mi)
- Basin size: 21,863 km^{2} (8,441 sq mi)
- Discharge
  - average: 104 m^{3}/s (3,700 cu ft/s)

Ramsar Wetland
- Official name: Schorren van de Beneden Schelde
- Designated: 4 March 1986
- Reference no.: 327

Ramsar Wetland
- Official name: Westerschelde & Saeftinghe
- Designated: 9 April 1995
- Reference no.: 748

Ramsar Wetland
- Official name: Vallées de la Scarpe et de l'Escaut
- Designated: 2 February 2020
- Reference no.: 2405

The Scheldt (/ʃɛlt, skɛlt/ SHELT, SKELT; French: Escaut [ɛsko]; Dutch: Schelde [ˈsxɛldə]) is a 435-kilometre-long (270 mi) river that flows through northern France, western Belgium, and the southwestern part of the Netherlands, with its mouth at the North Sea. Its name is derived from an adjective corresponding to Old English sċeald ("shallow"), Modern English shoal, Low German schol, West Frisian skol, and obsolete Swedish skäll ("thin").

== Course ==
The headwaters of the Scheldt are in Gouy, in the Aisne department of northern France. It flows north through Cambrai and Valenciennes, and enters Belgium near Tournai. Ghent developed at the confluence of the Lys, one of its main tributaries, and the Scheldt, which then turns east. Near Antwerp, the largest city on its banks, the Scheldt flows west into the Netherlands toward the North Sea.

Originally there were two branches from that point: the Oosterschelde (Eastern Scheldt); and the Westerschelde (Western Scheldt). In the 19th century, however, the Dutch built a dyke that cuts the river off from its eastern (northern) branch and connects Zuid-Beveland with the mainland (North Brabant). Today the river continues into the Westerschelde estuary only, passing Terneuzen to reach the North Sea between Breskens in Zeelandic Flanders and Vlissingen (Flushing) on Walcheren.

The Scheldt is an important waterway, and has been made navigable from its mouth up to Cambrai. Above Cambrai, the Canal de Saint-Quentin follows its course. The port of Antwerp, the second-largest in Europe, developed on its banks. Several canals (including the Scheldt-Rhine Canal connecting Antwerp to Rotterdam, the Albert Canal connecting it to Liège and the Brussel-Scheldt, Brussels and Brussels-Charleroi canals connecting it to Charleroi via Brussels) connect the Scheldt with the basins of the Rhine, Meuse, and Seine rivers, and with the industrial areas around Brussels, Liège, Lille, Dunkirk, and Mons.

The Scheldt flows through the following departments of France, provinces of Belgium, provinces of the Netherlands, and towns:

- Aisne (F): Gouy
- Nord (F): Cambrai, Denain, Valenciennes
- Hainaut (B): Tournai
- West Flanders (B): Avelgem
- East Flanders (B): Oudenaarde, Ghent, Dendermonde, Temse
- Antwerp (B): Antwerp
- Zeeland (NL): Hulst, Terneuzen, Sluis, Vlissingen

== History ==
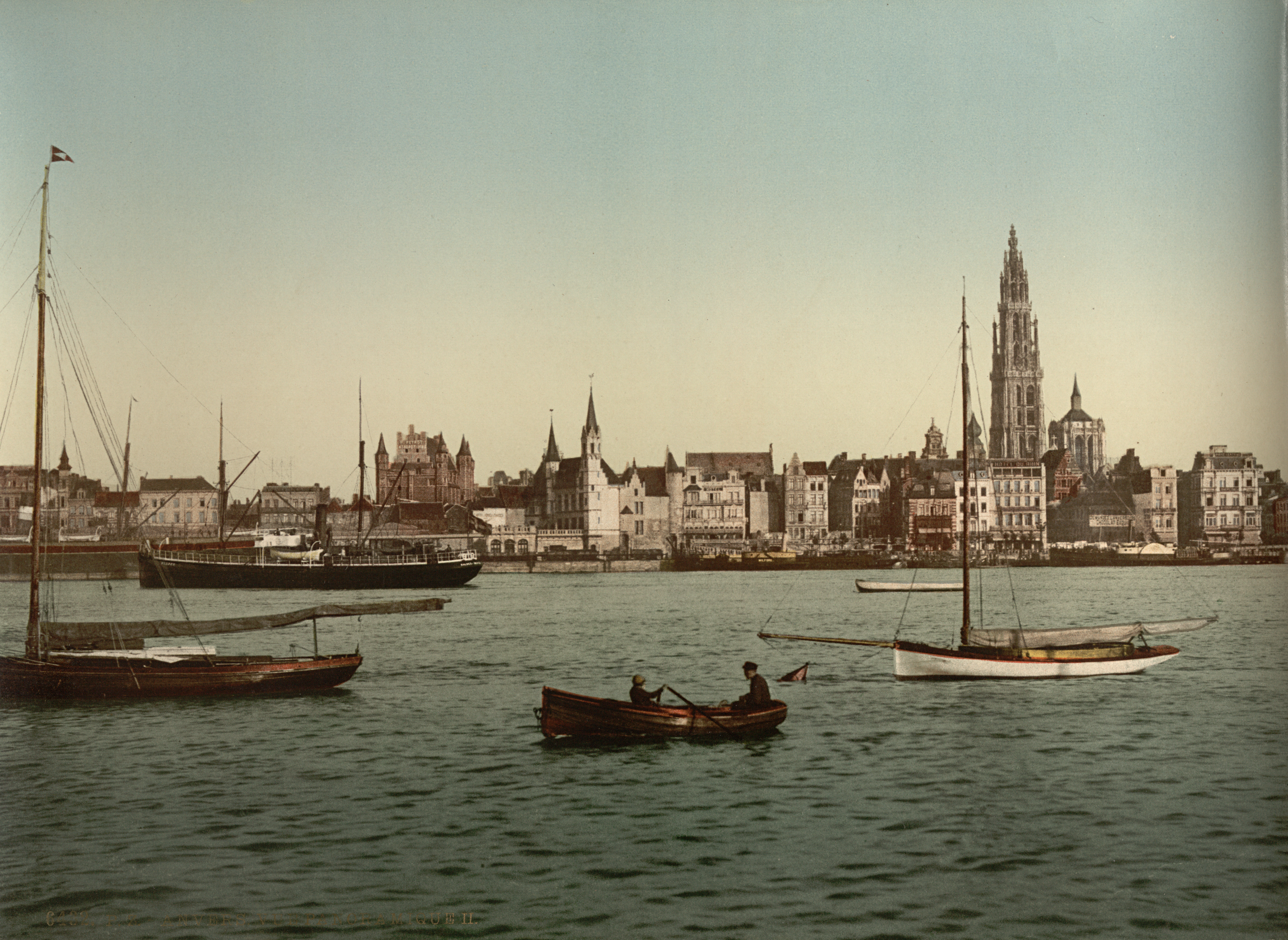
The Scheldt at Antwerp, photochrom, ca. 1890-1900

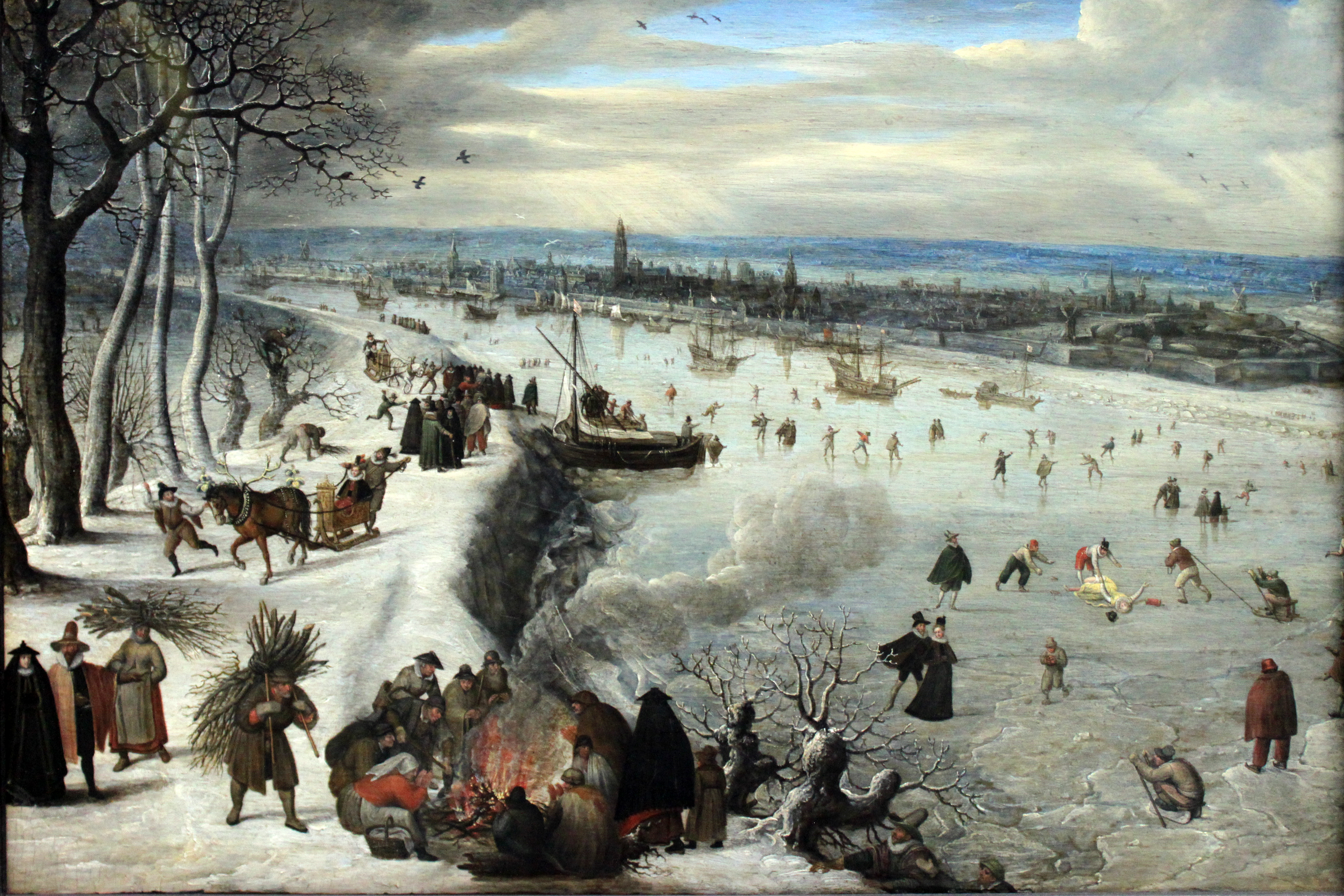
"View of Antwerp with the frozen Scheldt" (1590) by Lucas van Valckenborch

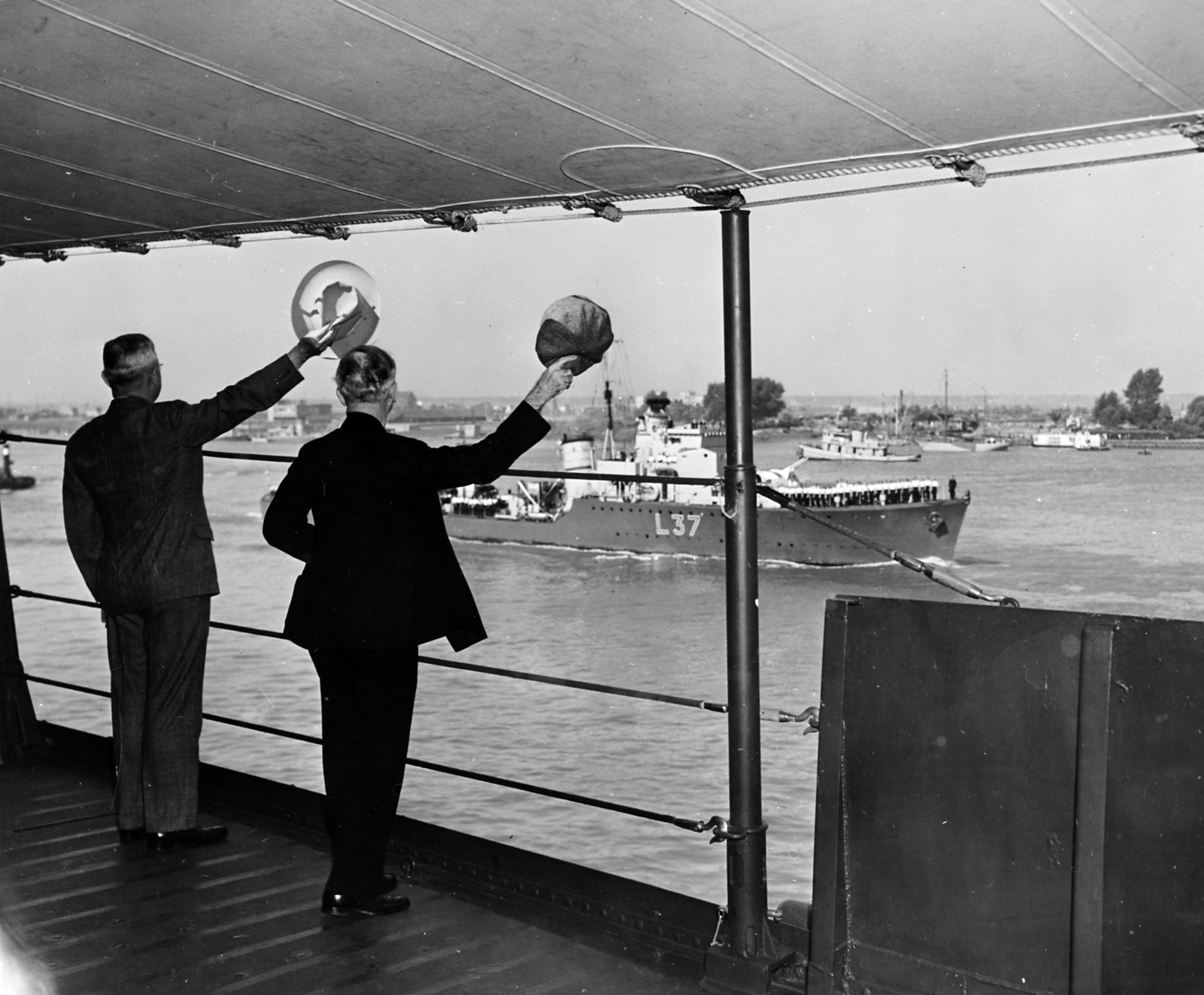
U.S. President Harry S. Truman and Secretary of State James F. Byrnes wave at HMS Hambledon while on board the USS Augusta on the river Scheldt as they head to the Potsdam Conference on 15 July 1945

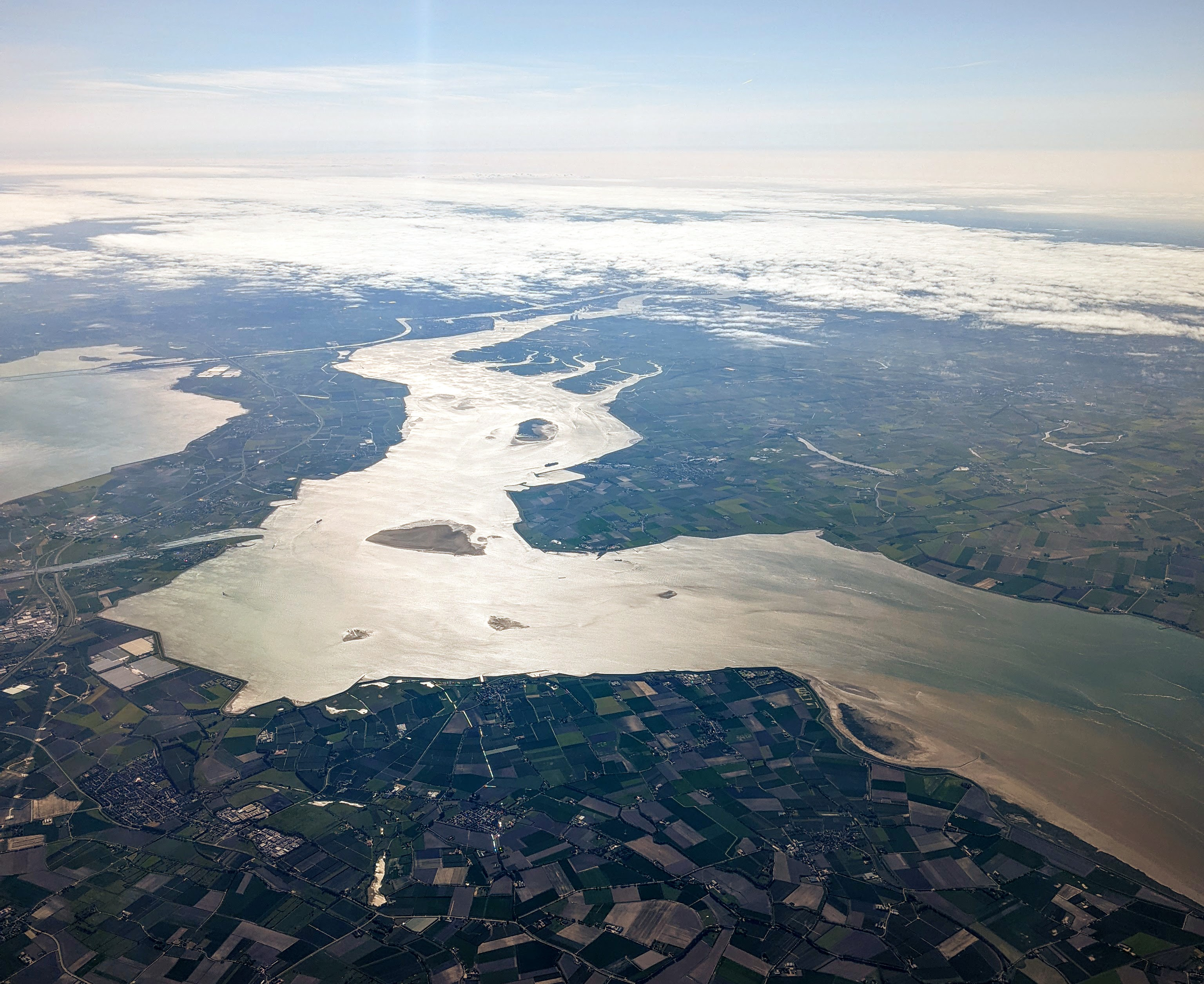
Aerial view of the Scheldt estuary, looking toward Antwerp from the northwest

The Scheldt estuary has always had considerable commercial and strategic importance. Called Scaldis in Roman times, it was important for the shipping lanes to Roman Britain. Nehalennia was venerated at its mouth. The Franks took control over the region about the year 260 and at first interfered with the Roman supply routes as pirates. Later they became allies of the Romans. With the various divisions of the Frankish Empire in the 9th century, the Scheldt eventually became the border between the Western and Eastern parts of the Empire, which later became France and the Holy Roman Empire.

This status quo remained intact, at least on paper, until 1528, but by then, both the County of Flanders on the western bank and Zeeland and the Duchy of Brabant on the east were part of the Habsburg possessions of the Seventeen Provinces. Antwerp was the most prominent harbour in Western Europe. After this city fell back under Spanish control in 1585, the Dutch Republic took control of Zeelandic Flanders, a strip of land on the left bank, and closed the Scheldt for shipping. That shifted the trade to the ports of Amsterdam and Middelburg and seriously crippled Antwerp, an important and traumatic element in the history of relations between the Netherlands and what was to become Belgium.

Access to the river was the subject of the brief Kettle War of 1784, and during the French Revolution shortly afterwards, the river was reopened in 1792. Once Belgium had claimed its independence from the Netherlands in 1830, the treaty of the Scheldt determined that the river should remain accessible to ships heading for Belgian ports. Nevertheless, the Dutch government would demand a toll from passing vessels until 16 July 1863.

In 1848, the Scheldt was used as the setting for Richard Wagner's opera Lohengrin.

The Question of the Scheldt, a study providing "a history of the international legal arrangements governing the Western Scheldt", was prepared for the use of British negotiators at the Treaty of Versailles in 1919.

In the Second World War, the Scheldt estuary once again became a contested area. Despite Allied control of Antwerp, German forces still occupied fortified positions in September 1944 throughout the Scheldt estuary west and north, preventing any Allied shipping from reaching the port. In the Battle of the Scheldt, the Canadian First Army successfully cleared the area, allowing supply convoys direct access to the port of Antwerp by November 1944.

== Tributaries and sub-tributaries ==
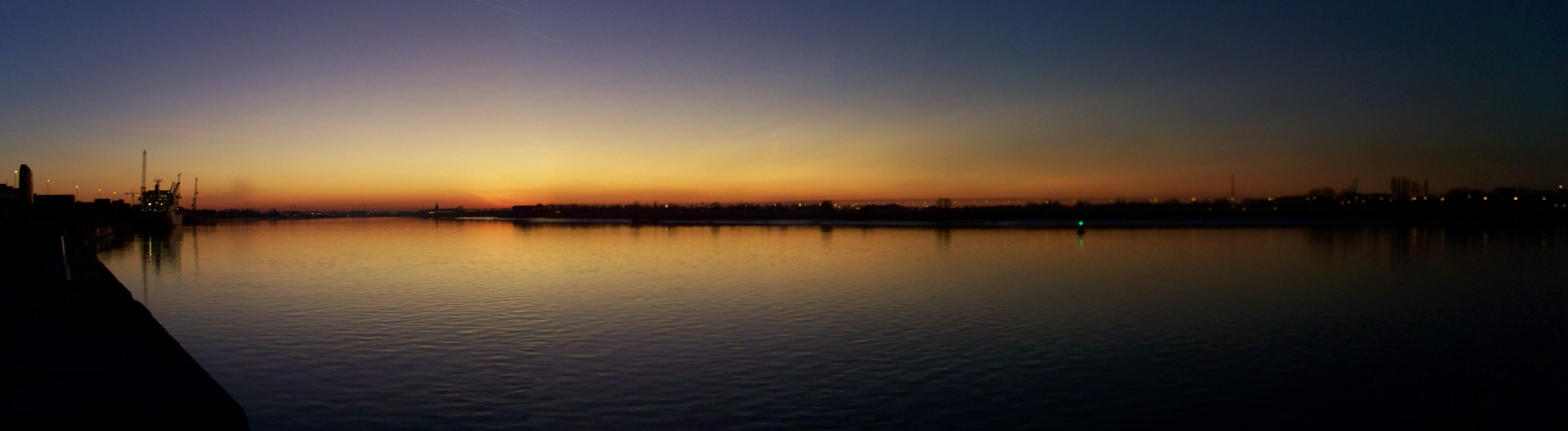
The Scheldt in Antwerp at sunset

- Western Scheldt or Honte (Vlissingen)
  - Schijn (Antwerp)
  - Rupel (Rupelmonde)
    - Nete (Rumst)
      - Kleine Nete (Lier)
        - Aa (Grobbendonk)
        - Wamp (Kasterlee)
      - Grote Nete (Lier)
        - Wimp (Herenthout)
        - Molse Nete (Geel)
        - Laak (Westerlo)
    - Dijle (Rumst)
      - Zenne (Mechelen)
        - Maalbeek (Grimbergen)
        - Woluwe (Vilvoorde)
        - Maalbeek (Schaerbeek)
        - Molenbeek (Brussels-Laeken)
        - Neerpedebeek (Anderlecht-Neerpede)
        - Zuun (Sint-Pieters-Leeuw-Zuun)
        - Geleytsbeek (Drogenbos)
        - Linkebeek (Drogenbos)
        - Molenbeek (Lot)
        - Senette (Tubize)
          - Hain (Tubize)
          - Samme (Braine-le-Comte-Ronquières)
            - Thines (Nivelles)
      - Vrouwvliet (Mechelen) [further upstream named Grote Beek, Meerloop, Raambeek, Zwartwaterbeek, Boeimeer]
      - Demer (Rotselaar)
        - Velp (Halen)
        - Gete (Halen)
          - Herk (Halen)
            - Melsterbeek (Herk-de-Stad)
          - Grote Gete (Zoutleeuw)
          - Kleine Gete (Zoutleeuw)
      - Voer (Leuven)
      - IJse (Huldenberg-Neerijse)
      - Nethen (Grez-Doiceau-Nethen)
      - Laan (Huldenberg-Terlanen-Sint-Agatha-Rode)
        - Zilverbeek (Rixensart-Genval)
      - Thyle (Ottignies-Louvain-la-Neuve)
  - Durme (Temse)
  - Molenbeek (Wichelen)
  - Dender (Dendermonde)
    - Mark (Lessines-Twee-Akren)
    - Ruisseau d'Ancre (Lessines)
    - Zulle (Ath)
    - Eastern Dender (Ath)
    - Western Dender (Ath)
    - Molenbeek-Ter Erpenbeek (Hofstade)
  - Lys/Leie (Ghent)
    - Mandel (Wielsbeke)
    - Heulebeek (Kuurne)
    - Gaverbeek (Kortrijk)
    - Douve (Comines-Warneton)
    - Deûle/Deule or Feule (Deûlémont)
      - Marque (Wasquehal)
      - Souchez (Lens)
        - Carency (Souchez)
        - Saint-Nazaire (Souchez)
    - Laquette (Aire-sur-la-Lys)
    - Lawe (De Gorge-Stegers)
      - Brette, (Biette), Blanche, ruisseau de Caucourt, fossé d'Avesnes (Loisne)
    - Clarence (Meregem)
      - Nave, Grand Nocq
    - Becque de Steenwerk (..)
  - Zwalm (Zwalm)
  - Rone (Kluisbergen)
    - Rhosne (Ronse)
  - Scarpe (Mortagne-du-Nord)
    - Crinchon (..)
    - Ugy (..)
  - Haine (Condé-sur-l'Escaut)
    - Trouille (Mons-Jeumont)
    - Hogneau of Honneau (Condé-sur-l'Escaut)
      - Honelle (Quiévrain)
        - Aunelle (..)
        - Grande Honelle (..)
        - Petite Honelle (..)
  - Rhonelle (Valenciennes)
  - Écaillon (Thiant)
  - Selle (Denain)
  - Torrent d'Esnes
  - Sensée (Bouchain)
    - Hirondelle (..)
  - Erclin (Iwuy)
  - Eauette (Marcoing)

== Navigation ==
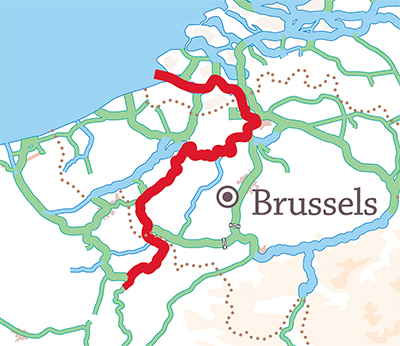
The navigable river Escaut/Scheldt from Cambrai to the North Sea (from European Waterways Map and Directory, 5th edition)

Canalisation from Cambrai down to Valenciennes was completed in 1788. Napoleon saw the benefits of linking Paris to Belgium and accelerated completion of the Canal de Saint-Quentin to the south. The locks were deepened and doubled, as coal became the essential commodity of the industrial revolution. Upgrading downstream from Bouchain was started in the 1960s in both France and Flanders, but the waterway is still not fully compliant with European standards. All the locks on the high-capacity section are being doubled by European Class Vb size locks, 185 by 12 m (607 by 39 ft), as part of the overall European Seine-Scheldt waterway project. The Pont des Trous, a listed fortified bridge in Tournai that has already been substantially modified, will again be raised to provide the necessary dimensions, including an air draught of 7.10 m (23 ft 4 in).

The 13 km section between Cambrai (connection with Canal de Saint-Quentin) and Hordain (connection with Canal de la Sensée) is only navigable for small ships (péniche) and has 5 locks.

== Ferry crossings ==
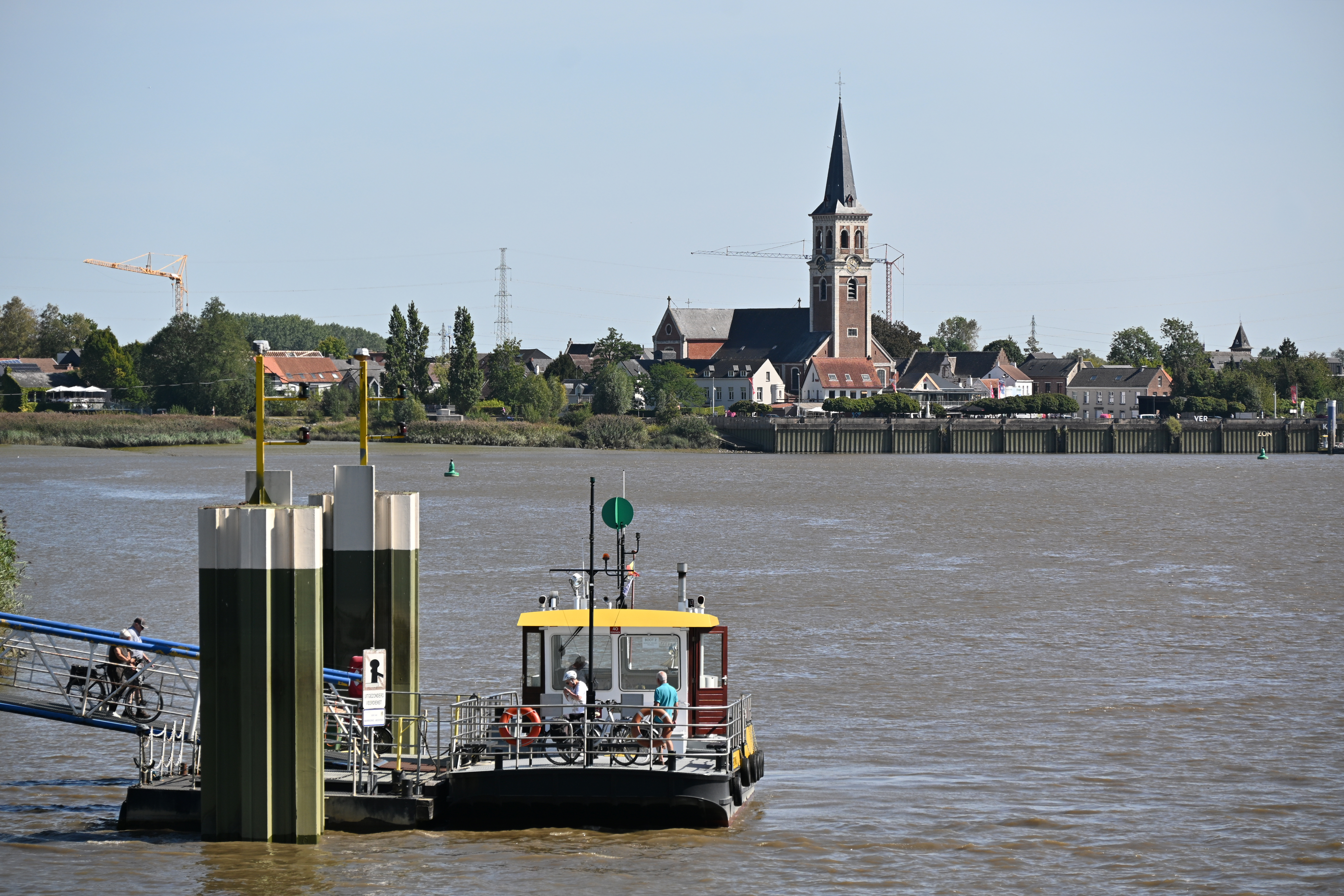
Ferry near Sint-Amands

Between Ghent and the Scheldt estuary, the river is crossed by several ferry services. Several of these have existed since the High Middle Ages. Going downstream, the first ferry is that of Schellebelle; the last before the mouth are Sint-Anna and Lillo-Doel in Antwerp.

== See also ==
- Scheldt–Rhine Canal
- Striene which was the main stem of the river until 1421, it flowed northwards.
- Zeeschelde
- Zwalm (River)
