= Pour Moi =

Pour Moi may refer to:

- Pour Moi (horse), an Irish-French racehorse
- Pour Moi Ltd, a British lingerie and swimwear brand
