= Rigby & Peller =

British luxury lingerie brand and retailer

- Industry: Fashion
- Founded: 1939
- Founder: Gita Peller; Bertha Rigby
- Headquarters: Schellebelle, Belgium
- Number of locations: Nine
- Services: Lingerie
- Parent: Van de Velde N.V.
- Website: rigbyandpeller.com

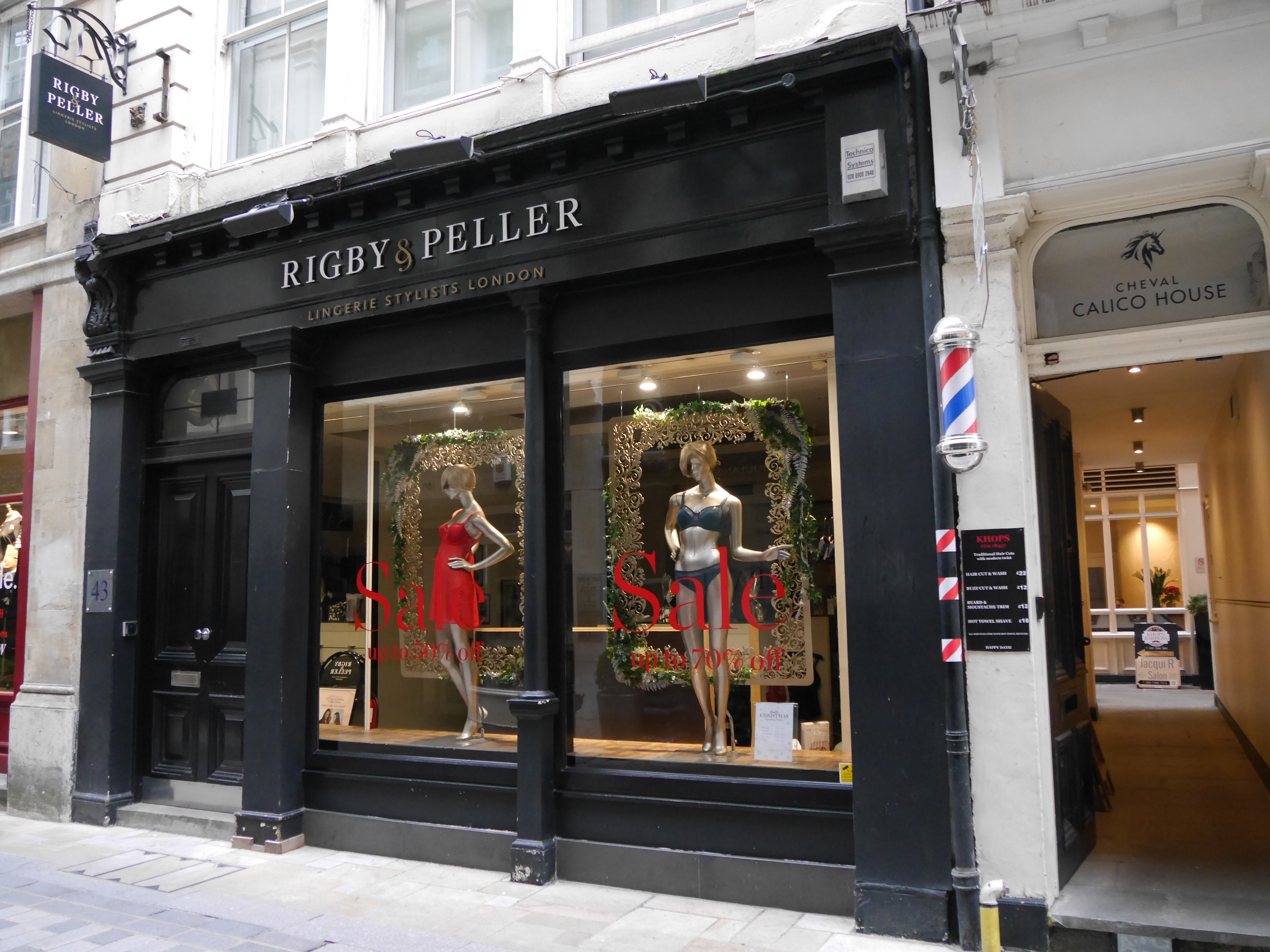
Rigby & Peller, Bow Lane, London EC4, 2018

Rigby & Peller is a British luxury lingerie brand and retailer. The company was founded in 1939 by Gita Peller, a Jewish Hungarian refugee who settled in London, and Bertha Rigby, an English corsetière, with a shop in South Molton Street in London's West End. As of 2011, they had seven stores as well as a website.

== History ==
In 1960, the company began providing bespoke undergarments to the Queen of the United Kingdom; they subsequently provided their products to Queen Elizabeth the Queen Mother, Queen Elizabeth II, Princess Margaret, Countess of Snowdon, Diana, Princess of Wales, Princess Beatrice of York and Princess Eugenie of York, as well as other members of the extended royal family. In addition to the royal family, the company has also sold products to Hollywood actresses, such as Gwyneth Paltrow and Scarlett Johansson, and musicians, such as Lady Gaga. Another notable supporter of Rigby & Peller was magazine editor Isabella Blow, who would sometimes wear the company's brassieres as outerwear in public. As of 11 January 2018 they have lost their Royal warrant due to a autobiographical book written by June Kenton titled Storm in D-Cup and published in 2017 advising about her trips to Buckingham Palace.

In 1982, Rigby & Peller was purchased for £20,000 by June Kenton and her husband Harold. They were assisted in the management of the company by their children, Jill Kenton and David Kenton. In 2011 Van de Velde N.V., a Belgian brassiere manufacturer, purchased a majority stake in Rigby & Peller. Van de Velde, which paid £8 million for an 87 per cent stake in the company, had previously supplied Rigby & Peller with some of their products. The cost of Rigby & Peller's brassieres ranges between £50 and £200 and they offer sizes up to a K cup. In the 21st century, the company has experienced some difficulty in competing with larger, better-known rivals and discount retailers.

June Kenton has placed an emphasis on providing women with correctly fitting brassieres, and the company is known for its unique bra-fitting (fitting by eye). June has stated, "A tape measure doesn't say, for instance, 'she's big here with a narrow back.' It just gives you numbers. But we can look at what figure type you are and find the solution immediately." Although Kenton personally measured the royal family, she refuses to discuss the particular undergarments they wear.
