= Vijay Patel =

Vijay Patrel may refer to:

- Vijay Patel (businessman), Indian-English businessman
- Vijay Patel (politician) (born 1960), Indian lawyer and politician
