= Rubbens (distillery) =

Gin distillery in Belgium

Rubbens is a Belgian company that distils jenever. For most of its history it has been a family business, owned by the Rubbens family and located in Zele. The company buildings in Zele have been abandoned since 2014. The company is meanwhile active at a new location in Wichelen.

== History ==
In 1817 Melchior Singeleyn founded an agricultural distillery in Zele, East Flanders. Originally, it was a farm that processed its surplus grain into alcohol. In 1872, under the leadership of Charles (Karel) Rubbens, agricultural activities were phased out in favour of an expansion of the distillery. In 1877 new buildings, with an industrial steam boiler and a round brick chimney, were constructed for the storage and processing of larger quantities of grain into jenever. Charles Rubbens subsequently gave his name to the company. In 1880, the distillery employed three people. Charles Rubbens regularly expanded the company’s land holding, via purchases and inheritance.

When Charles died in 1910, his widow Dymphna Callebaut managed the farm and the distillery until 1911, when sons Jean and Benoit Rubbens took over. Benoit was responsible for administration and sales. Jean, a graduate agricultural engineer, took care of the technical side. After the disruption of World War I, they modernised the company which was then known as Rubbens bros Liqueur Distillery. In 1920 the company employed 5 people.

During World War II, the rationing of raw materials forced the distillery to operate at a reduced rate. After the war, management passed to Jean's daughters, Elisabeth and Martha Rubbens. Together with their husbands they further expanded the distillery. In 1950, new warehouses were added and the mechanisation of production was improved.

In 2008, the family sold Rubbens Distillery to farmer Dirk Beck from Sint-Gillis-Waas. Between 2009 and 2014, to expand its production capacity, the distillery moved to Wichelen, to the industrial site of former steel drawing mill N.V. Produrac. Dirk Beck turned the activities of the distillery and the farm into a cycle: the grain produced by the farm was sent to the distillery for alcohol production and the spent grain was subsequently used as animal feed. In 2021 his son Hendrik Beck became co-manager of the company.

== Production ==
The first production run was grain jenever. It was sold to outlets such as shops and inns in white stoneware jars and 30 and 50 litre oak casks.

Under the leadership of Jean and Benoit Rubbens, the company experienced its first major boom when it started to produce 'Vieux-Système' jenever, from 1911 onwards. Production was subsequently greatly diversified to include, among other things, liqueurs. Alcohol production was eventually phased out and more use was made of imported alcohol and self-produced distillates.

In 2021, Rubbens range included more than 120 products under different brand names, from jenever and gin, to aperitifs, liqueurs, absinthe and even non-alcoholic syrups. Beer production also commenced in that year.

== Buildings ==
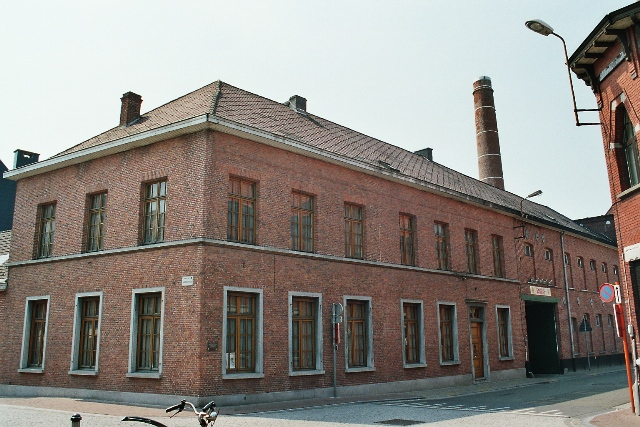
Buildings of the distillery in the Langemuntstraat 1-3 in Zele, Belgium

After the company moved, the original distillery, which was built in 1872 on the corner of Langemuntstraat and Oudburgstraat, was converted into an apartment block. Its original façade, a familiar sight in the centre of Zele, was retained. As well as 25 apartments and 4 family homes, a commercial building was also built. The project was called De Stokerij (The Distillery). The façade of the owners’ mansion, with the year 1817 above the door, was listed as architectural heritage. That protection was lifted in 2023.

== Trivia ==
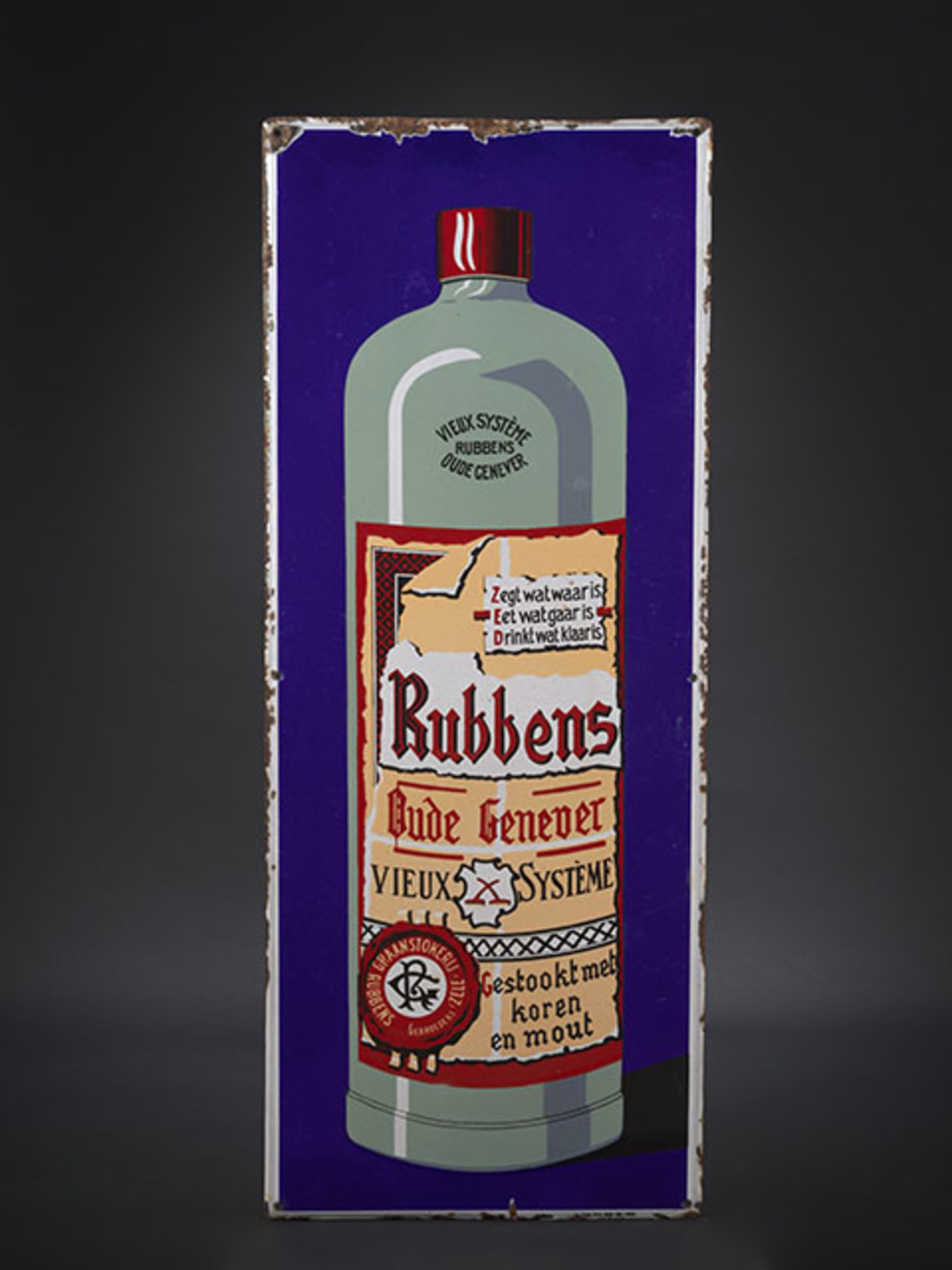

The Rubbens Distillery logo included a seahorse. It is said that this is because the hippocampus – the part of the brain affected by alcohol – is shaped like that bony little fish.

Distillery Rubbens promoted its products with, among other things, enamel signs. In 1949, it ordered a series of six enamel signs from Émaillerie Belge, in an edition of 55 copies of each. Many of these have been preserved by collectors.
