= Olivia von Halle =

British luxury fashion house

- Company type: Private
- Industry: Fashion
- Founded: 2011; 15 years ago
- Founder: Olivia von Halle
- Headquarters: London, England
- Website: oliviavonhalle.com

Olivia von Halle is a British fashion label known for its range of luxury silk pyjamas and nightwear.

== Background ==
Olivia Von Halle (née Falconer) was born in 1983 in Newcastle upon Tyne. She moved to Fairseat, Kent aged two and attended Tonbridge Grammar School for Girls and Combe Bank. After studying Fashion and Textile Management at Leeds University, Olivia von Halle worked for The Future Laboratory in London as a trend forecaster for clients including Louis Vuitton, Gucci Group and Lamborghini. In 2008 she moved to Shanghai, China where she continued working as a trend forecaster and as a luxury brand consultant.

Olivia von Halle is married to Hugo von Halle. The couple have two sons, Hieronymus Vladimir Azax and Dionysus Cosmo Chaos, and a daughter, Triptych Alabama Bliss.

== About ==
In September 2011, Olivia von Halle launched her eponymous label at London Fashion Week. By 2018, the brand was stocked in over 120 stores across 26 countries including Harrods, Selfridges, Bergdorf Goodman, Neiman Marcus and Net-a-Porter. The brand has been featured in global publications including Vogue, Vanity Fair, Harpers Bazaar, Elle and Tatler.

== Awards ==
In 2013, Olivia von Halle was announced as a ‘Walpole Brand of Tomorrow 2013’, in association with Mishcon de Reya. Olivia von Halle was declared Lounge and Nightwear brand of the year at the UK Lingerie Awards during an awards ceremony at the Freemason’s Hall. In 2013, Olivia von Halle was awarded the Blue Butterfly Trust Mark for Positive Luxury for the company's corporate social responsibility programme.
