= Rustin =

Rustin may refer to:

== People ==
- Bayard Rustin (1912–1987), American civil rights activist
- Jean Rustin (1928–2013), French painter

== Places ==
- Ruştin, a village in Cornereva Commune, Caraş-Severin, Romania

== Film and television ==
- Rustin, a 2001 American film, directed by and starring former CFL all-star quarterback Rick Johnson
- Rustin (film), a 2023 American film
- Rust Cohle or Rustin, a fictional character from the television series True Detective

== See also ==
- Ruston (disambiguation)
- West Chester Rustin High School, a high school in Pennsylvania named after Bayard Rustin
