= Liam Fahy =

Zimbabwean shoe designer (born 1984)

Liam Fahy (born 26 October 1984) is a shoe designer from Zimbabwe.

== Biography ==
Liam Fahy was born in Harare, Zimbabwe. Fahy studied Footwear Design at De Montfort University and was awarded several design awards including Drapers Student Designer of the Year and the Lineapelle Young Designer award. After graduating with honors, Fahy won inaugural Fashion Fringe Accessories award, judged by Manolo Blahnik and Colin McDowell, winning an internship with accessory designer Rupert Sanderson.

In 2012 Fahy received the British Fashion Council NewGen award.
