= Kiss Me Deadly (company) =

British lingerie company

- Type: Private
- Industry: Fashion
- Founded: 2006 in London, UK
- Founder: Catherine Clavering
- Key people: Catherine Clavering (MD)
- Products: Lingerie
- Website: www.kissmedeadly.co.uk

Kiss Me Deadly is a British lingerie brand established in London in 2006 by Catherine Clavering. The brand won the "UK's Favourite British Designer" award at the 2012 UK Lingerie Awards.

== History ==
Kiss Me Deadly was established in 2006 by Catherine Clavering, who founded the brand after struggling to find a "decent garter belt". The company is based in Sheffield and London. The retro designs are inspired by the lingerie and fashion of the 40s and 50s.

== Recognition ==
The brand won the publicly-voted "Favourite British Designer" award at the 2012 UK Lingerie Awards and was nominated for the "Best Independent Directional Brand" the same year.

The brand was also nominated for the "Favourite Lingerie Brand" award in 2013 and the "Favourite British Designer" in 2013 and 2014. Kiss Me Deadly has been featured in a number of magazines.

== See also ==
- Dolfin Swimwear
