= Lizzie Haines =

English model

- Born: 1980 (age 45–46)
- Occupation: Lingerie model
- Known for: Winner of the 2011 Star in a Bra competition

Lizzie Haines is a plus-size model. She was born in 1980 and currently resides in Uppingham near Leicester.

== Career ==
Haines is best known for being the winner of the 2011 Star in a Bra competition run by lingerie firm Curvy Kate in May 2011, beating Emma Donaghy and Georgina Horne. She was a model for Curvy Kate 2012.

After winning Star in a Bra, Haines went on to win the Plus Size Model of the Year at the Plus Size Awards for 100percentpeople.com in December 2011.

She owns her own business called Do it Momma which specializes in photography and personalized textiles and in February 2012 she was invited to be a Judge for the 2012 Star in a Bra competition.
