= Debbie Sell =

British speech and language therapist (born 1954)

Debbie Sell, OBE, FRCSLT (born 21 June 1954) is a leading British speech and language therapist.

== Life and career ==
Sell qualified in 1976 with a diploma in speech pathology and therapeutics from the College of Education in Leicester. Her first appointment as a speech therapist was at Whipps Cross Hospital, where she worked from 1976 to 1978. Between 1978 and 1981, she worked at St. Georges Hospital, Tooting, London. In 1981 she moved to Great Ormond Street Hospital in London and was appointed head of the department of speech and language therapy in 1996. She gained her Ph.D. in 1992 from De Montfort University for an investigation of speech outcome in Sri Lankan cleft palate subjects with delayed surgery.

She was a key member of the Sri Lankan Cleft Lip and Palate Project, and was Assistant Director of the Eurocleft Speech Group. In the late 1990s, she directed the speech research of the national UK Clinical Standards Advisory Group (CSAG) study in cleft lip and palate, and was subsequently a member of the National Cleft Implementation Group.

She became Honorary Lecturer at Institute of Child Health and then Honorary Senior Lecturer in 1999. From 1999 to 2003, she was visiting professor at the Faculty of Health and Community Studies, De Montfort University, and in 2003 was Distinguished Visiting Fellow at the Institute of Advanced Studies University of Latrobe in Melbourne, Australia and the Royal Children's Hospital.

== Career ==
Her research interests are several and include the management and evaluation of velopharyngeal function, including surgical and prosthetics outcomes associated with structural anomalies and the 22q11DS group, the delivery of speech and language therapy in the developing world for patients with cleft lip and palate, and methods for the perceptual evaluation of speech.

Sell has worked on developing speech therapy training in Sri Lanka, and she has used nasopharyngoscopy as a means to allow people to see inside their mouth while working on speech therapy.

Together with Dr Triona Sweeney, Sell led the PLAT (Parent Led Articulation Training) Research Programme, which has resulted in the Speech@Home online speech therapy resource for families of children born with cleft palate.

== Current posts ==
- Head of Speech and Language Therapy, Great Ormond Street Hospital, London
- Lead Speech and Language Therapist, North Thames Regional Cleft Lip and Palate Service (St. Andrew's Centre, Broomfield Hospital, Essex and Great Ormond Street Hospital, London
- Honorary Senior Lecturer, Institute of Child Health, University College London
- Visiting Professor, Faculty of Health and Community Studies, De Montfort University, Leicester
- Adjunct Specialist, Department of Audiology and Speech Sciences, Michigan State University, U.S.

== Honors and awards ==
She was awarded the Fellowship of the Royal College of Speech and Language Therapists for "work of special value to the profession in one or more of the following areas: research, teaching, publishing, practice" in 1999. In 2001, she received a Distinguished Fellowship Award from the La Trobe University/Children's Hospital in Melbourne, Australia. In 2005 she was awarded the OBE for services to the National Health Service.

== Selected publications ==
- Sell, Debbie; Grunwell, Pamela; Mildinhall, Sue; Murphy, Terrie; Cornish, Tremaine A. O.; Bearn, David; Shaw, William C.; Murray, John J.; Williams, Alison C.; Sandy, Jonathan R. (2001). "Cleft Lip and Palate Care in the United Kingdom – The Clinical Standards Advisory Group (CSAG) Study. Part 3: Speech Outcomes". The Cleft Palate-Craniofacial Journal. 38 (1): 30–37. doi:10.1597/1545-1569_2001_038_0030_clapci_2.0.co_2. ISSN 1055-6656. PMID 11204679. S2CID 208147788.
- Watson, A.; Sell, Debbie; Grunwell, Pamela, eds. (2001). Management of Cleft Lip and Palate. Wiley. ISBN 978-1-86156-158-9.
- John, Alexandra; Sell, Debbie; Sweeney, Triona; Harding-Bell, Anne; Williams, Alison (2006). "The Cleft Audit Protocol for Speech – Augmented: A Validated and Reliable Measure for Auditing Cleft Speech". The Cleft Palate-Craniofacial Journal. 43 (3): 272–288. doi:10.1597/04-141.1. ISSN 1055-6656. PMID 16681400. S2CID 39340015.
- Henningsson, Gunilla; Kuehn, David P.; Sell, Debbie; Sweeney, Triona; Trost-Cardamone, Judith E.; Whitehill, Tara L. (2008). "Universal Parameters for Reporting Speech Outcomes in Individuals with Cleft Palate". The Cleft Palate-Craniofacial Journal. 45 (1): 1–17. doi:10.1597/06-086.1. ISSN 1055-6656. PMID 18215095. S2CID 36532079.
- Mars, Michael; Habel, Alex; Sell, Debbie, eds. (2008). Management of cleft lip and palate in the developing world. Chichester, England: John Wiley. ISBN 978-0-470-51816-8. OCLC 609989055.

== See also ==
- Speech and language pathology
