= Schellebelle ferry =

River ferry in Schellebelle, Belgium

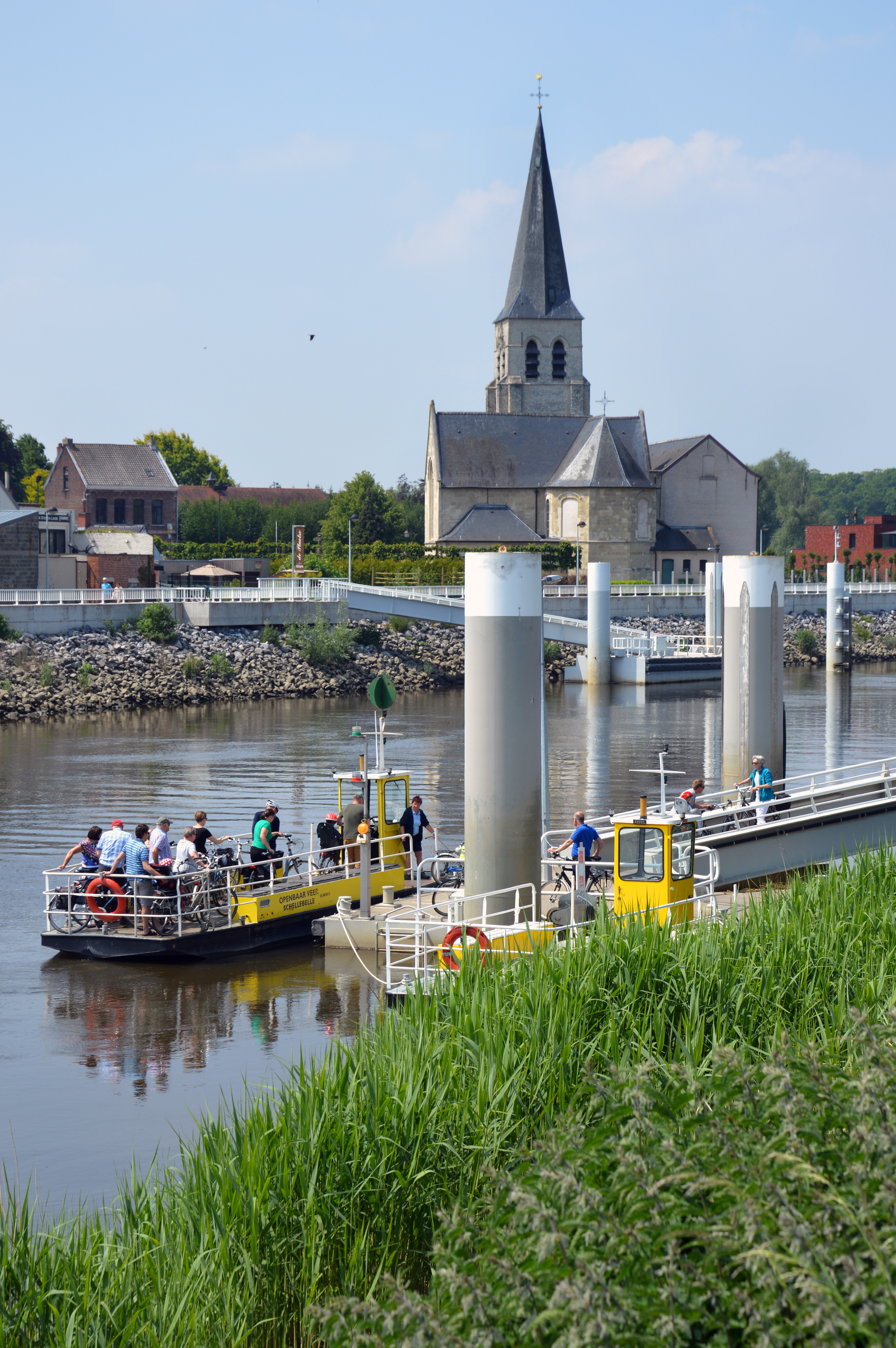
- Locale: Schellebelle
- Waterway: Scheldt
- Transit type: river ferry
- Owner: Flemish Government
- Began operation: ca. 13th century

The Schellebelle ferry (Dutch: veer van Schellebelle) is a ferry across the river Scheldt in the town of Schellebelle in Belgium. Historically a cable ferry, it's been in use since the early 13th century and connected the town of Schellebelle with its meadows across the river. It now connects to a small hamlet in the nature reserve Kalkense Meersen in the Scheldt Valley National Park, popular with cyclists and hikers. The ferry is operated daily and free to use.

== External link ==
- Official website (in Dutch)
