= Michael Scott (academic) =

British academic and university administrator

Michael Scott is a British academic and university administrator. A professor of English literature, he was vice-chancellor of Glyndŵr University in Wrexham, Wales until 2015.

Educated at the University of Wales, Lampeter, and the University of Nottingham, Scott holds a PhD from De Montfort University. He was professor of English and head of the school of humanities at Sunderland Polytechnic, before becoming pro vice-chancellor of De Montfort University in 1989. Scott was, for 14 years, visiting professor of English at Georgetown University, Washington, D.C.
