= Rolf Noskwith =

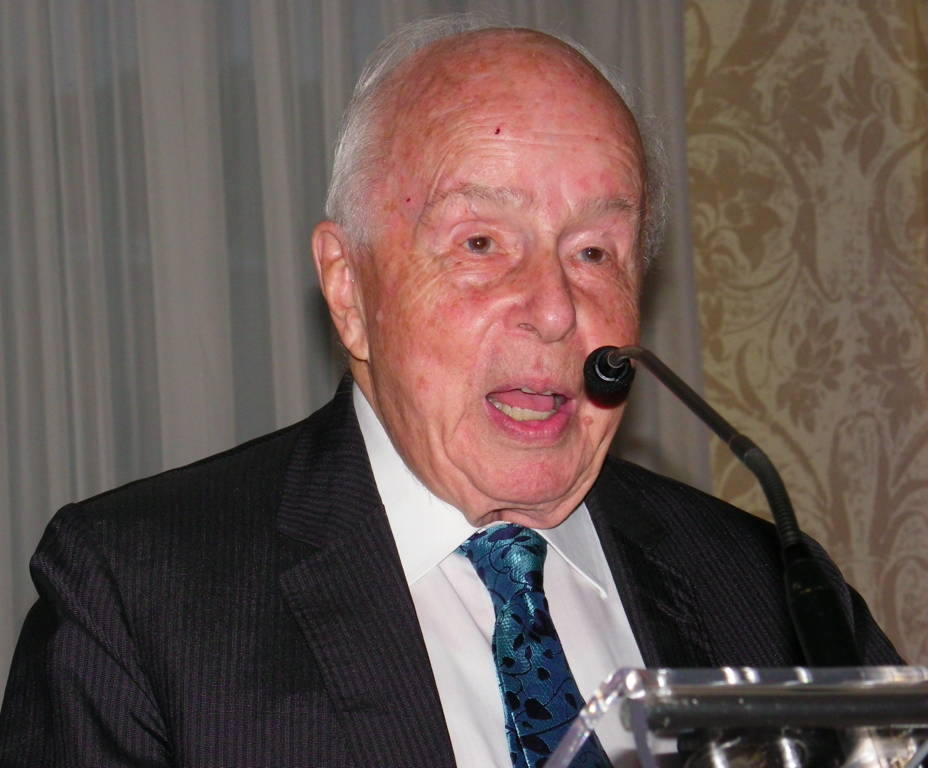
- Noskwith in 2012
- Born: 19 June 1919; Chemnitz, Germany
- Died: 3 January 2017 (aged 97); London, England, UK
- Education: Trinity College, Cambridge
- Occupations: Soldier, businessman
- Years active: 1941–2016
- Known for: Cryptography and business
- Board member of: Charnos
- Children: 1

Rolf Noskwith (19 June 1919 – 3 January 2017) was a British businessman who during the Second World War worked under Alan Turing as a cryptographer at the Bletchley Park British military base.

== Early life and education ==
Noskwith's parents, Chaim (Charles) and Malka (née Ginsberg), were Eastern European-born Jews who set up a clothing manufacturing company in Germany. Seeing that the political and economic conditions were worsening, they sold their business and emigrated to England in 1932, along with their children. The family created another textile company, Charnos, in Ilkeston, Derbyshire, England, that would become the basis of Noskwith's post-war life. Noskwith was educated at Nottingham High School and Trinity College, Cambridge.

== Service in the Second World War ==
Initially, he was not accepted for military service, but after his third attempt, he was accepted to work as a translator and cryptographer at the Bletchley Park facility. His first attempt to work as a codebreaker was turned down because of his German birth and upbringing, but it seems that the security eligibility rules were revised in May 1941 thereby enabling him to enlist.

=== Government Code and Cypher School, Bletchley Park ===
After being interviewed by C. P. Snow and Hugh Alexander, Noskwith was recruited to Bletchley Park and arrived in June 1941. He worked in Hut 8, focusing on the German navy's Enigma machine, decrypting the Kriegsmarine's coded wireless traffic from 1941 to 1945, and subsequently on other ciphers. He joined the crib subsection, headed by Shaun Wylie. One of Noskwith's noted talents was lining up cribs with cipher text strips, to see if they matched.

Noskwith's biggest accomplishment was breaking the Naval Enigma Offizier settings. He created a crib based on the letters 'EEESSSPATRONE' and had placed into queue to be crunched by Bletchley's bombe analogue computers. The letter pairings referred to colour-coding used by German ships' flares as "friend or foe" detection. When the crib worked, it allowed the Allied forces to read German messages sent to and from Kriegsmarine officers.

Noskwith recalled that most people were addressed by their first name there: the two exceptions were Alan Turing, known as "Prof"; and F.A. Kendrick, whom he was surprised to see listed in the index of Hinsley and Stripp's book Codebreakers as Kendrick, Tony.

== Later life and death ==
Beginning in 1946, Noskwith worked for Charnos, the textile company founded by his father, and became its chairman in 1952. Around the year 2000, he was made non-executive chairman of Charnos plc.

Noskwith died on 3 January 2017, aged 97. He is thought to have been the last surviving cryptographer of Bletchley Park at the time of his death. Shortly after his death, The Jewish Chronicle published a tribute to Noskwith and other Jewish codebreakers by the director of GCHQ Robert Hannigan, who described their contribution as "out of all proportion to the size of the Jewish community in Britain at the time". Noting the contribution of Jewish staff at Bletchley to the foundation of Israel after World War II he referred to Noskwith's offer of his services in 1947 to Walter Eytan, who responded "of codebreakers we have plenty!".

Following Noskwith's death, a two-page mathematical manuscript handwritten by Alan Turing was found among his papers and sold at Bonhams auction house in London for £44,000 to King's College, Cambridge, Turing's former college.
