= Karolina Laskowska =

British fashion designer (born 1992)

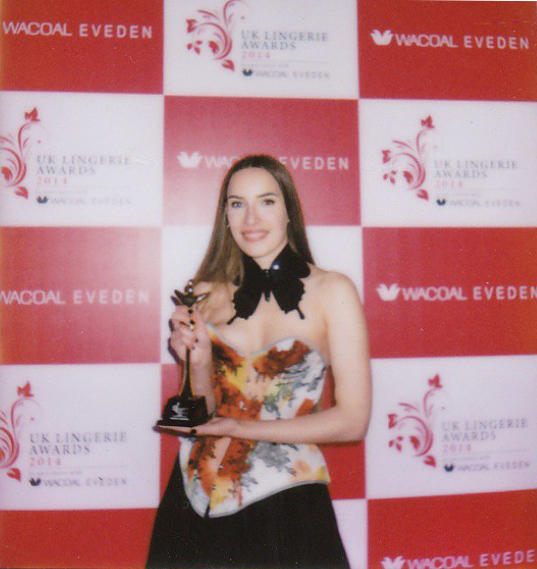
- Laskowska at the 2015 UK Lingerie Awards
- Education: BA Contour Fashion (De Montfort University); Notting Hill & Ealing High School
- Occupation: Fashion designer
- Label: Karolina Laskowska
- Awards: 2014 UK Lingerie Awards; New Designer of the Year
- Website: karolinalaskowska.com

Karolina Zofia Laskowska (born 1992) is a British fashion designer. She won the New Designer of the Year award at the 2014 UK Lingerie Awards.

== Career ==
Laskowska started her eponymous fashion brand in 2012 whilst still studying at De Montfort University, due to high demand for her designs. In 2014 she graduated with a BA in Contour Fashion. Her designs were featured in the 2014 London Graduate Fashion Week and have been featured in a number of magazines. In 2016 she founded The Underpinnings Museum, a digital museum dedicated to the history of underwear.

=== Awards ===
Laskowska won the New Designer of the Year award at the 2014 UK Lingerie Awards. She also won the Lingerie Edit "Press' Best Brand" award in January 2015.
