= Helen Mary Coaton =

British artist

- Born: 1911; Leicester, England
- Died: 2005 (aged 93–94); Surrey, England
- Education: University of Bristol; Leicester College of Art
- Known for: Sculpture

Helen Mary Coaton (1911–2005) was a British artist, known for her sculptures in both wood and stone.

== Biography ==
Coaton was born in Leicester and was educated at the Wyggeston School for Girls in that city before studying for a history degree at Bristol University. After graduating she enrolled in the Leicester College of Art where she was taught sculpture by Percy Brown from 1937 to 1942. In 1942 Coaton was awarded the Hinton Prize by the Leicester Society of Artists, of which she was an active member. She was also a member of the Artists' International Association and frequently exhibited both wood, stone and bronze sculptures with both bodies. For a time Coaton lived in Chelmsford in Essex before moving to Surrey, where she died in 2005. The New Walk Museum in Leicester holds examples of her work.
