= Pour Moi Ltd =

British clothing retailer

- Company type: Private limited company
- Industry: Retail
- Founded: 1998; 28 years ago Macclesfield, UK
- Founder: Michael Thomson
- Headquarters: Brighton, UK
- Number of locations: 4 Stores
- Area served: United Kingdom; United States; Europe; Asia; Middle East
- Products: Lingerie, swimwear, nightwear, clothing
- Website: pourmoi.co.uk

Pour Moi Ltd (generally known as Pour Moi) is a British multinational fashion brand specialising in lingerie, swimwear, nightwear, clothing and sportswear which has its headquarters in Brighton, England. Pour Moi has three stores based in Chester and Leeds selling online to over 50 countries worldwide.

== History ==
Pour Moi started in Macclesfield, Cheshire in 1998 and began selling bras via independent boutique Elle Lingerie in Rugby in 2005. They launched their first independent retail store in Macclesfield, followed by another shop in Chester soon afterwards, along with concessions in Figleaves and Littlewoods.

Pour Moi has grown its base of wholesale clients to include Asos, Next and Zalando and entered the US market with Bare Necessities in 2019. In January 2019, Pour Moi acquired Charnos, Lepel & LF Intimates.

Pour Moi launched its direct-to-consumer website in 2015, and a US website in December 2020.

== Operations ==
Pour Moi has a three channel model: wholesale, via partners such as Asos and Next; direct-to-consumer via its two websites, and via its stores in Chester and Leeds.

Pour Moi works closely with celebrities & influencers, releasing edits with Love Island star India Reynolds, actress Helen Flanagan, television and media personality Vicky Pattison and Jess Wright from The Only Way is Essex. Its Energy Empower U/W Lightly Padded Sports Bra has received several recommendations from publications such as Closer, Good Housekeeping and Women's Running.

It also collaborated with Melanie Brown to launch its 'Own Your Confidence' campaign. With additional collaboration with the style guru, television presenter and star of How To Look Good Naked, Gok Wan, who joined forces with Pour Moi on the continuation of their Own Your Confidence campaign.

== Management ==
Michael Thomson is the CEO and Founder of Pour Moi.

== Awards ==
Pour Moi was announced of the womenswear brand of the year at the 2022 Drapers Awards. Previously it was shortlisted as a finalist in the 2021 Drapers Awards for Lingerie Brand of the Year and Best Marketing Campaign of 2021 with the #GetYourWiggleOn Campaign. Pour Moi was shortlisted as a finalist in the Drapers Awards in 2019, in the Lingerie Brand of the Year category.

In 2022 Pour Moi launch of their own initiative, the Pour Moi Uplifting Women Awards, an event that recognises the amazing achievements of women from across the UK. Following the success of its 2022 awards evening, Pour Moi hosted the second Pour Moi Uplifting Women Awards in 2023 with broadcast presenter and journalist Vanessa Feltz appearing as one of the judges.

=== External links ===
- Official website
