= June Kenton =

British businesswoman

June Kenton is a British businesswoman who owned Rigby & Peller for 29 years. She received the official Royal Warrant at the time of her purchase of the company in 1982. Since then she has fitted several members of the British royal family, and several well-known actresses and entertainers.

== Business career ==
Kenton and her husband purchased Rigby & Peller in 1982 for £20,000. Rigby & Peller were awarded a Royal Warrant on the establishment of their store in 1939, but this did not transfer to, and it was awarded separately to her when she bought the business in 1982. In August 2011, they sold an 87 percent stake of the firm to Van de Velde for £8 million. Kenton remained on the board of the company, with her son David.

After Kenton developed breast cancer, she created a line of lingerie specifically for mastectomy patients. She discovered prosthetists were making prosthetics based on the size of the bra the woman believes she is wearing is correct and thus created her own line of corrected-fitted lingerie for mastectomy patients.

She also rebranded Rigby & Peller, expanding to seven different locations worldwide including the US and Dubai. She provided all the underwear and swimwear for How to Look Good Naked by Gok Wan as well as the movie Miss Pettigrew Lives for a Day.

Kenton's clients have included Queen Elizabeth II, the Queen Mother, the Countess of Snowdon, Princess Margaret, Diana, Princess of Wales, Kate Middleton, Kim Kardashian, Joan Collins, Jessie J, Lady Gaga, Cherie Blair, Dawn French, Scarlett Johansson, and Jo Brand.

Her autobiography Storm in a D Cup was to be published by Troubador (publishers) at the end of 2017.

== Awards and recognition ==
Kenton was awarded an honorary degree from Leeds Metropolitan University "in recognition of her lifelong services to the British intimate apparel industry. She also has a Lifetime Achievement Award from the UK lingerie industry.

Kenton was one of the speakers at the 2012 MT Inspiring Women Conference and a charity evening for Jewish Child's Day in March 2017, entitled Fit for a Queen.
