= Curvy Kate =

Lingerie brand

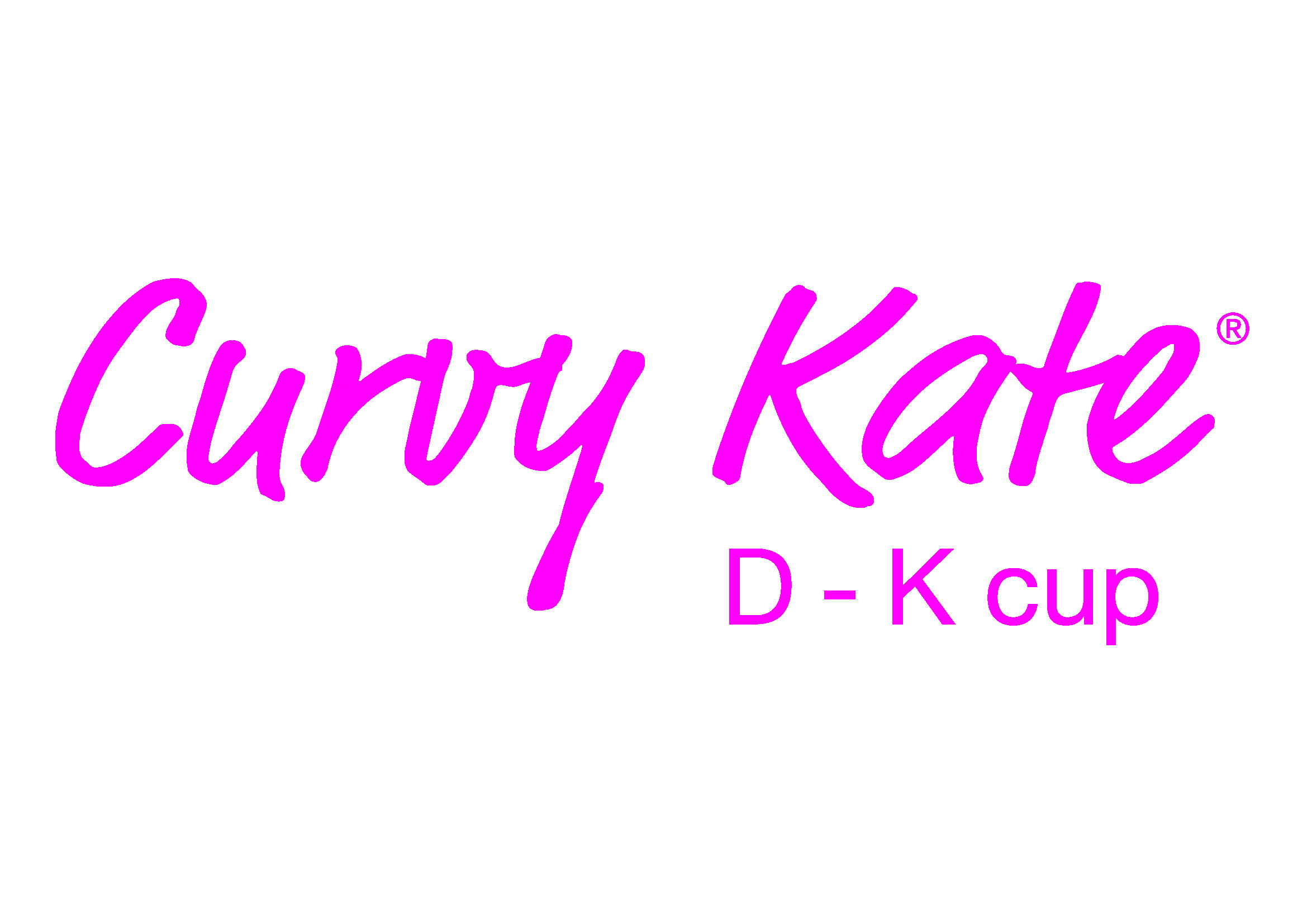
- Founded: 2009
- Headquarters: 1 Harefield Road Uxbridge UB81PH, Uxbridge, United Kingdom
- Key people: Steve Hudson (Founder/Director)
- Products: Lingerie & swimwear
- Brands: Curvy Kate & Scantilly by Curvy Kate

Curvy Kate is a lingerie brand specialising in D – K cup Bras and Swimwear. They are currently based in Uxbridge, London. Curvy Kate officially launched in July 2009 at the Harrogate Lingerie Show.

Curvy Kate previously ran a ‘Star in a Bra’ competition to scout customer models to represent the brand in a section of campaigns, with winners including: Emma Tabor (2008) Lauren Colfer (2009) Laura Ann Smith (2010) Lizzie Haines (2011) Sophie Morgan (2012) Lotte Williams (2013) and Sophia Adams (2015).
