= Charnos =

British hosiery manufacturer

Charnos is a British hosiery manufacturer, founded in 1935 by Charles Noskwith in Ilkeston, Derbyshire, and later run by his son Rolf Noskwith.

In January 2019, LF Intimates sold Charnos to Pour Moi Ltd.
