= North Thames Regional Cleft Lip and Palate Service =

The North Thames Regional Cleft Lip and Palate Service also known as the North Thames Cleft Centre is responsible for treating children and adult patients with clefts of the lip and palate the North Thames region. This includes North London, Essex and South and West Hertfordshire.

This service is run jointly by the St Andrew's Centre, Broomfield Hospital, Chelmsford and Great Ormond Street Hospital, London.

In 1995, the number of centres in England and Wales offering treatment for clefts was reduced from around fifty to thirteen. This means the specialist teams at the thirteen centres are now treating more patients with clefts per year and as a result are able to offer a better service to their patients and families.

== Research ==
The North Thames Cleft Team have been involved in extensive interdisciplinary research and have many ongoing projects.
