= Nichole de Carle =

British fashion designer

- Born: 1984 (age 41–42); England
- Education: De Montfort University (BA)
- Occupation: Fashion designer
- Label: Nichole de Carle

Nichole de Carle is a British fashion designer best known for her lingerie and swimwear brand of the same name.

== Personal life ==
De Carle was born in Leicestershire. She graduated with a BA in Contour Fashion from De Montfort University in 2005. She has two sisters. Her sister Charlotte de Carle became a fashion model after modelling lingerie for Nichole.

== Career ==
De Carle worked for fashion designers Alexander McQueen and Donna Karan before starting her eponymous fashion brand (also known as NDCL) in October 2009. The brand produces bondage-themed lingerie and underwear, drawing inspiration from things such as architecture. Her 2011 "White Diamond" knickers featured a 0.1 carat diamond and received significant press coverage due to the £232 price.

In 2012, De Carle organised a charity calendar featuring British female sporting celebrities, raising money for the Wellbeing of Women charity.

The brand is often worn by celebrities, particularly during live performances, including Beyoncé, Jessie J, Nicole Scherzinger, Cheryl Cole and Paloma Faith.

=== Television ===
De Carle featured in episode 3 of E4 reality talent competition Great British Hairdresser. She also appeared in episode 4 of reality show Dirty Sexy Things.

=== Awards ===
The brand was nominated for the 2011 UK Lingerie Awards in the "Independent Directional Brand" category.
