= Lineapelle =

Lineapelle is an international trade exhibition for the tannery and leather goods sector which is held twice yearly in the fair district of Milan, Italy: in February for the following year‘s Spring/Summer season and in September for Fall/Winter. It covers an area of around 45,500 m² and features around 1,300 exhibitors and 20 thousand visitors from more than 100 countries. The first edition was held in 1981 in Milan, inspired by the Preselezione Italiana Moda shows which had been held in Florence since 1971. Lineapelle moved to Bologna in 1986.

The exhibition is organised by Lineapelle S.p.A., a Milan-based company which, since 2003, has run Lineapelle Asia, a parallel exhibition in Canton aimed at the Asian market. It also holds previews of the ideas and trends which will be showcased at the Bologna show in Milan (Anteprima) and New York City (Trend Selection NY: ‘New trends in leather, textiles and synthetics for shoes, handbags, leathergoods and leatherwear’).
