= Kingsley Pungong =

Cameroonian sports businessman

- Born: Kingsley Pungong; 1976 (age 49–50); Cameroon
- Education: De Montfort University; Harvard University
- Occupation: Business executive
- Years active: 2007- Present
- Known for: Sports business
- Notable work: CEO at Rainbow Sports Global
- Title: Founder and CEO

Kingsley Pungong (born 1976), is a Cameroonian sports entrepreneur. Since 2009, Kingsley is the founder and CEO of Rainbow World Group and Rainbow Sports Global, an integrated media and sports company which owns properties and assets across the sports value chain. The group owns a Cameroonian football club, Rainbow FC, and Kenyan Football club Rainbow FC Kenya and have recently made an acquisition in Cote Divoire. Between 2017 and 2024, Kingsley was the owner of a Czech Republican football club, Mfk Vyskov. Kingsley is also the co-founder of the African Fighters League (AFL) which known to launch Dambe Warriors League in Nigeria.

== Education ==
Kingsley holds a Bachelor of Laws degree from De Montfort University in England. He is an alumnus of The Wharton School in the U.S. He holds a Masters in Entrepreneurship from Judge Business School, University of Cambridge, and a Master's degree in history from Harvard University.

== Career ==
Since 2007, Kingsley worked for a Californian-based international agency, Wasserman Group which is among the leading agencies for talent managing markets like National Basketball Association and the English premiere league. He served as head of the group's strategy for the Africa, until 2009.

== Business career ==
In 2009, Kingsley founded Rainbow Sports Global. Rainbow Sports is an integrated media and sports company with several divisions founded strategically to connect the African football ecosystem to the world. The company operates globally providing management, marketing, and media solutions for football sports agencies, clubs and talented African football players. By 2020, Kingsley through Rainbow Sports through its clubs had facilitated a number of player transfers to MLS, USL and European leagues, including Christian Bassogog (Shanghai Shenhua – China), Nouhou Tolo (Seattle Sounders – USA) and Olivier Mbaizo (Philadelphia Union – USA). Oyongo Bitolo was also one of Rainbow Sports' clients. In 2022, Rainbow Sports announced the launch of the African Football Data Centre (AFDC), an open, digital platform created in support of the development of football on the Africa continent.

Kingsley through Rainbow Sports is the owner of Rainbow FC, a football in Bamenda, Cameroon. From 2017, he was the owner of Mfk Vyskov, a football club in Czech Republic which listed him among few Africans to own a football club in Europe. In January 2024, Kingsley Pungong sold Mfk Vyskov to the American investment group Blue Crow Sports Group, which also owns Spanish club, CD Leganés.

== See also ==
- Mfk Vyskov
