= Wichelen =

- Municipality
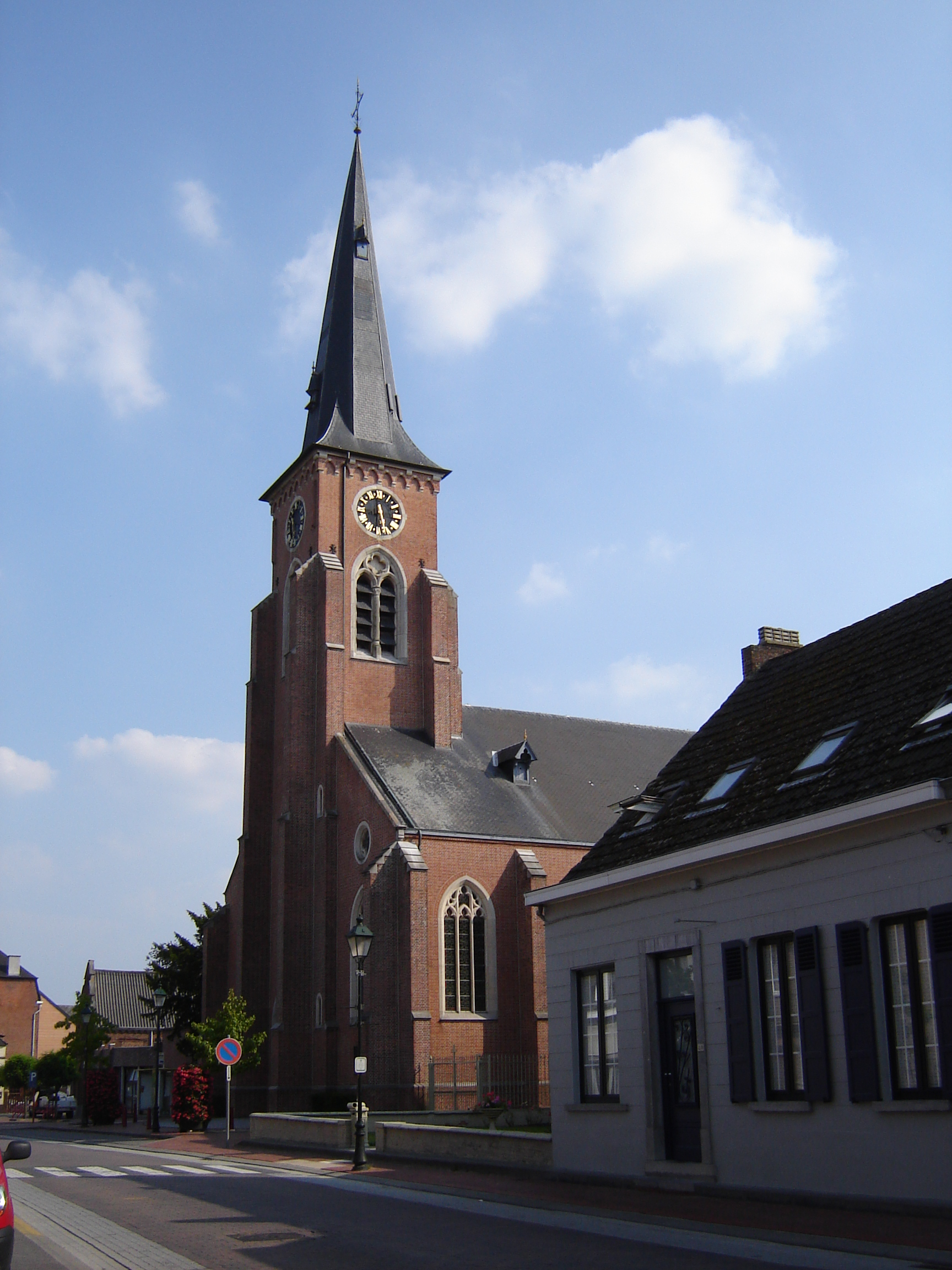

- Flag Coat of arms

- Location of Wichelen in East Flanders
- Interactive map of Wichelen
- Location in Belgium
- Coordinates: 51°00′N 03°58′E
- Country: Belgium
- Community: Flemish Community
- Region: Flemish Region
- Province: East Flanders
- Arrondissement: Dendermonde

Government
  - Mayor: Kenneth Taylor (SAMEN)
  - Governing party: SAMEN

Area
  - Total: 23.2 km^{2} (9.0 sq mi)

Population (2018-01-01)
  - Total: 11,578
  - Density: 499/km^{2} (1,290/sq mi)
- Postal codes: 9260
- NIS code: 42026
- Area codes: 09
- Website: www.wichelen.be

Wichelen (Dutch pronunciation: [ˈʋɪxələ(n)]) is a municipality located in the Denderstreek in the Belgian province of East Flanders, comprising the towns of Schellebelle, Serskamp and Wichelen proper. In 2021, its population was 11,690 and its area 22.87 km^{2}.

The river Scheldt runs through Wichelen, and in Schellebelle, it is crossed by the Schellebelle ferry. The Molenbeek crosses Wichelen in Schellebelle, Serskamp and Wichelen. Natural areas of interest include the Kalkense Meersen near Schellebelle, Bergenmeersen in Wichelen, and Serskampse bossen near Serskamp.

Luxury lingerie manufacturer Van de Velde N.V. and distillery Rubbens are headquartered in the municipality.

== Gallery ==
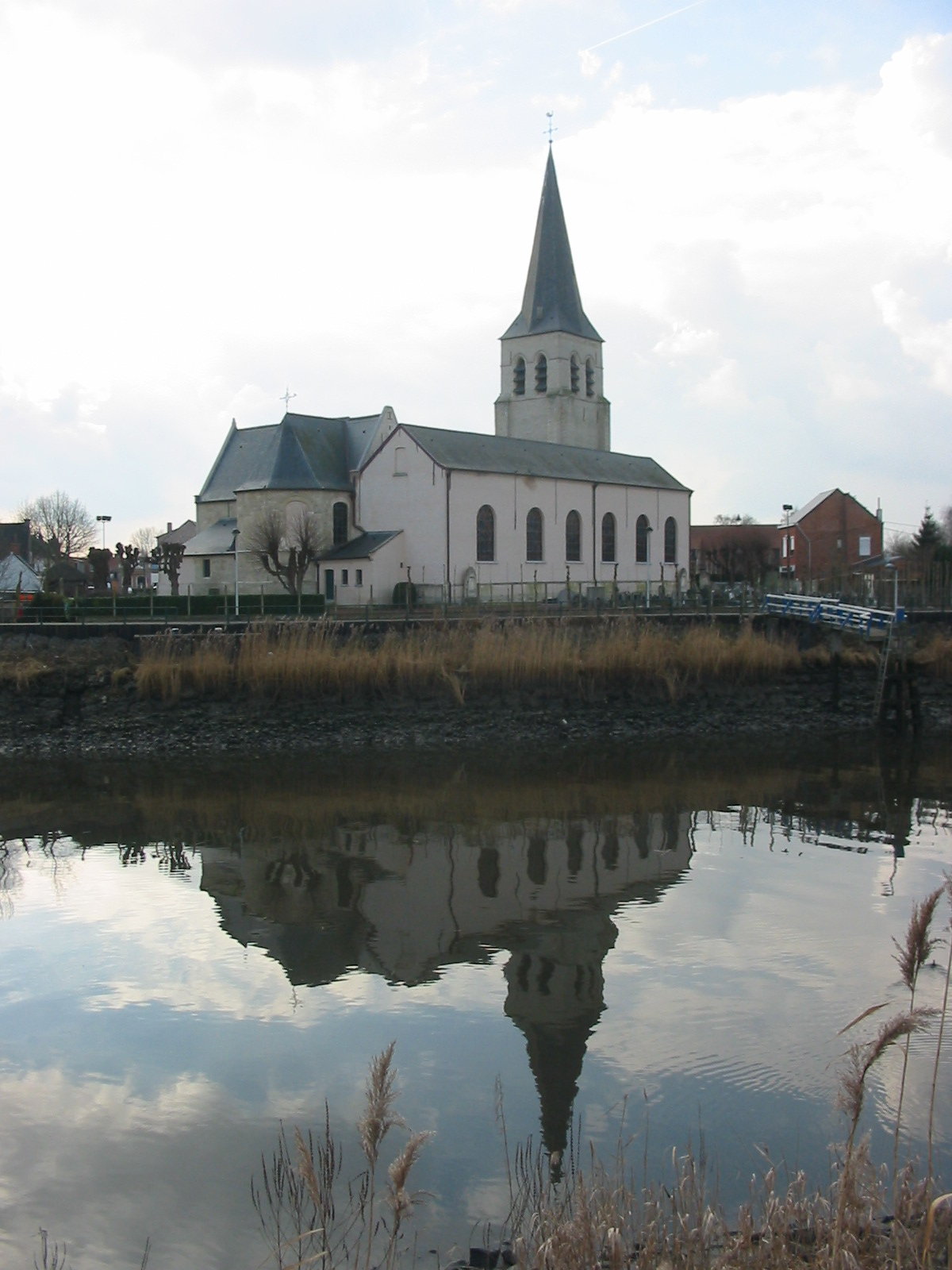
The church of Schellebelle overlooks the Scheldt

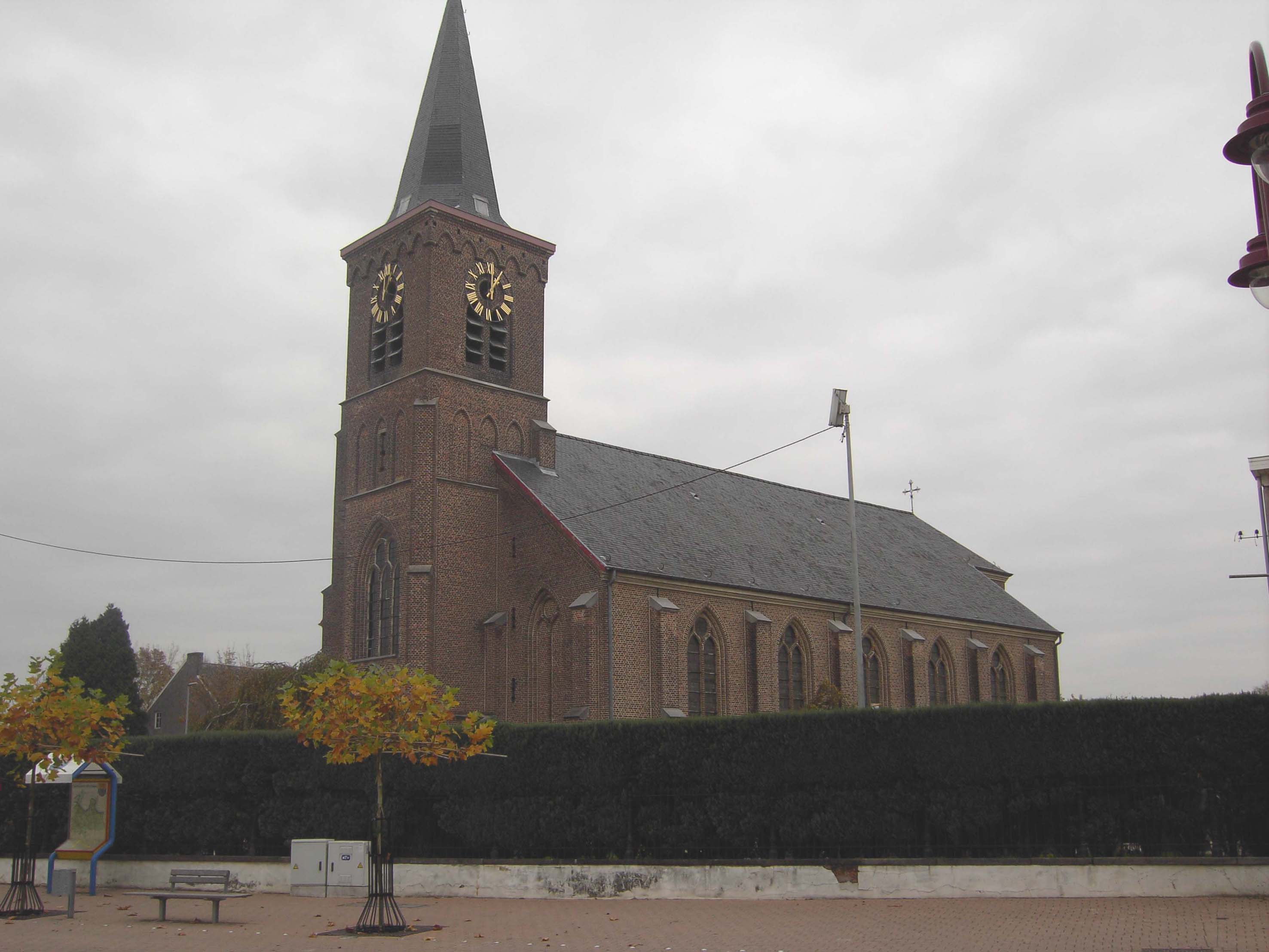
Sint-Denijs church in Serskamp

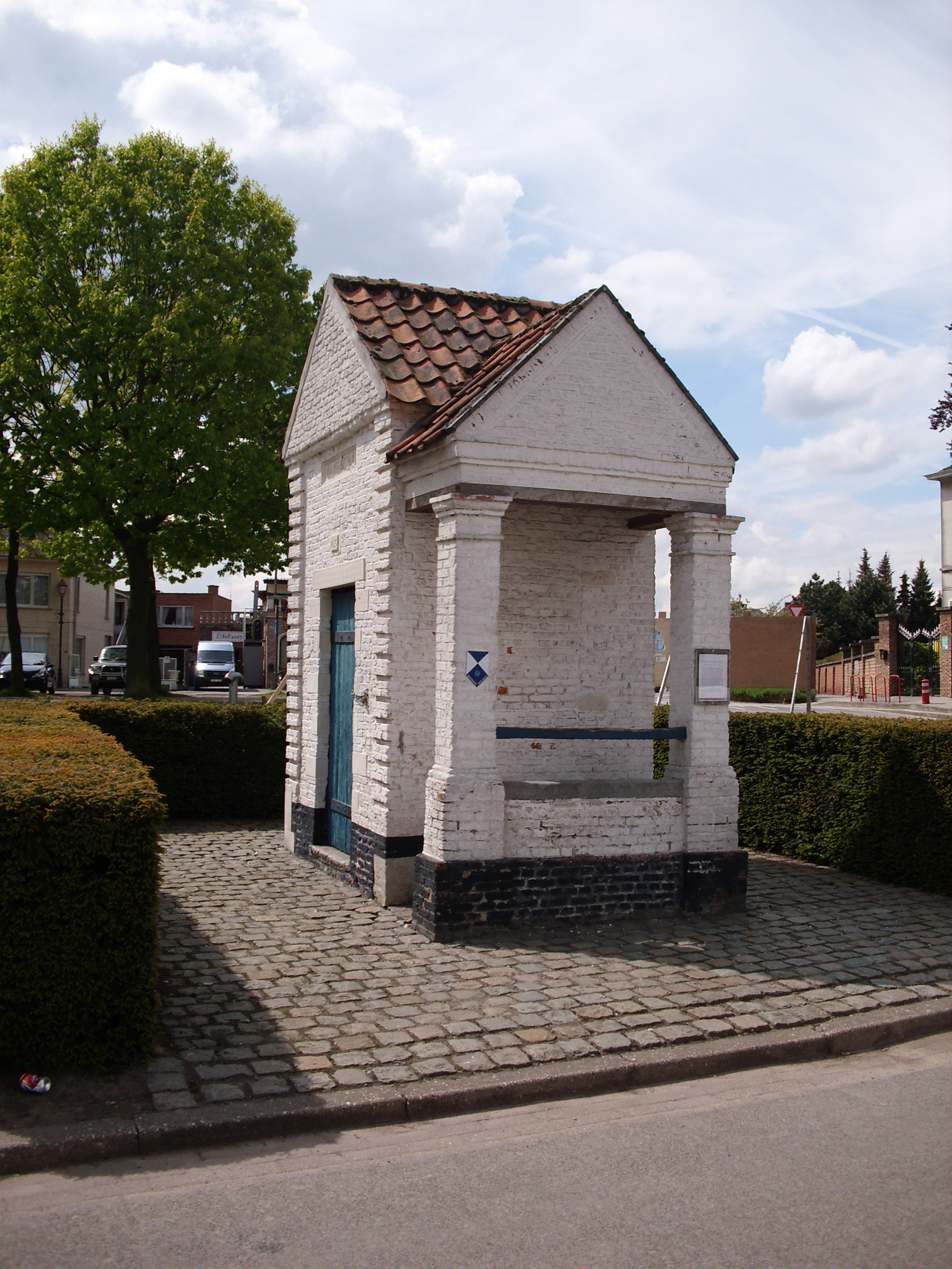
Former roephuisje and prison for one person in Schellebelle
