= Van de Velde N.V. =

Belgian lingerie company

Van de Velde nv
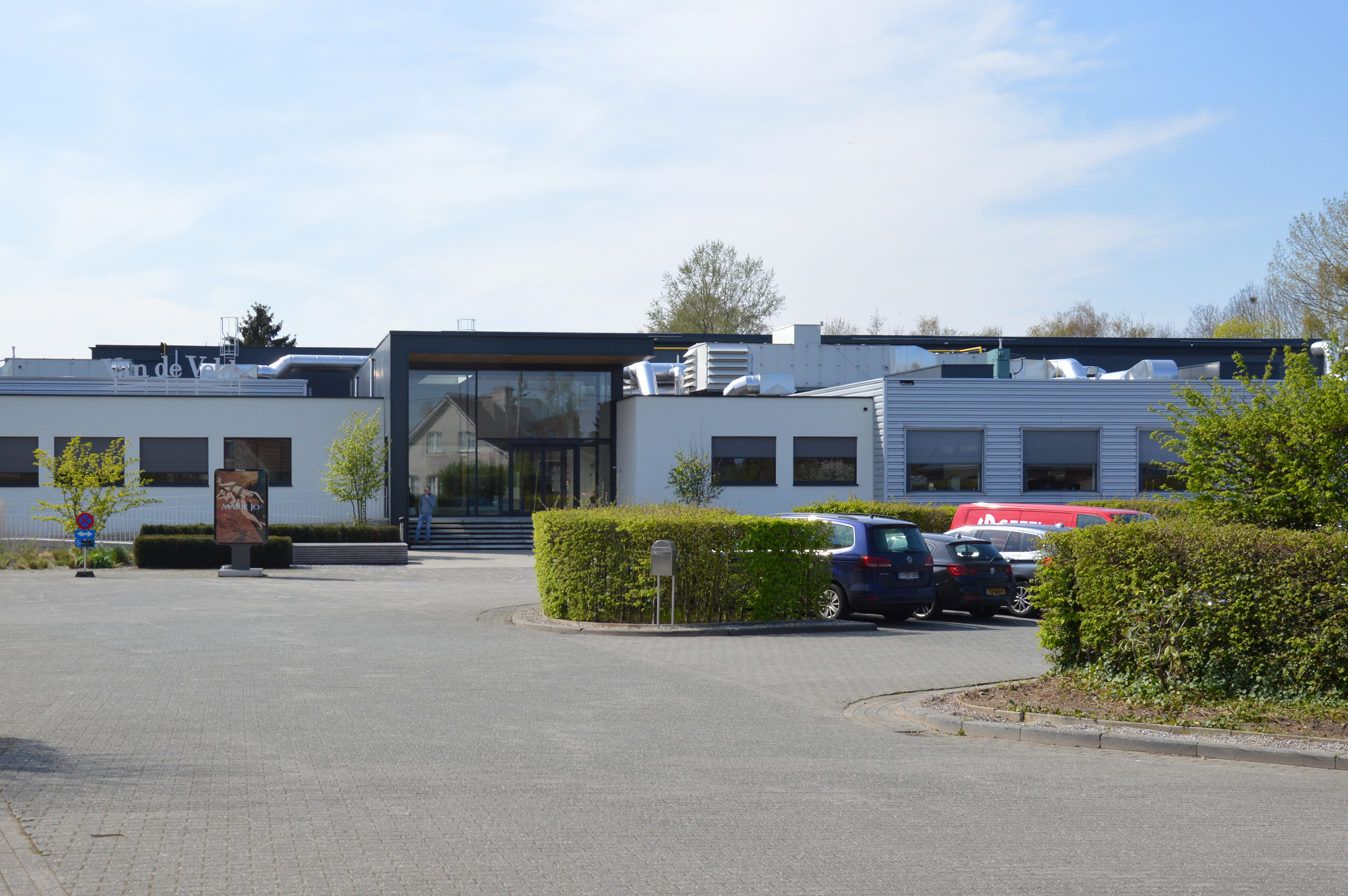
- Type: Naamloze vennootschap
- Traded as: Euronext Brussels: VAN
- ISIN: BE0003839561
- Industry: Manufacturing, Retail, Fashion
- Founded: 1919
- Number of locations: Belgium, UK, US, the Netherlands, Tunesia, Finland, Germany, Spain, Hungary
- Key people: CEO Karel Verlinde
- Services: Premium, perfect fit lingerie
- Number of employees: +1500 worldwide
- Website: vandevelde.eu

Van de Velde nv is a publicly traded company that designs and manufactures luxury lingerie. Its headquarter is located in the Belgian town of Schellebelle (Wichelen). The company was founded in 1919 by Achiel and Margaret Van de Velde and is still owned by the same family.

== Overview ==
With over 100 years of experience, Van de Velde produces the famous premium lingerie brands, Marie Jo, Primadonna and SARDA. Van de Velde has +1500 employees worldwide in Belgium, Tunesia, Germany, UK, US, Finland, Netherlands, Hungary, Spain.

Its products are designed in Schellebelle, and produced abroad. The majority of the company's production activities take place in Tunisia. Van de Velde also produces in China.

== Trademarks ==
The premium lingerie products are sold under the brand names: Marie Jo, Primadonna and SARDA, Rigby & Peller and Lincherie are the retail brands of Van de Velde.

In 2021 Van de Velde Lingerie's total turnover was €195,3 million

Some important Milestones

- 1919: Founding by Achiel and Margaretha Van de Velde
- 1919–1945: First generation: Manufacture of corsets
- 1945–1980: Second generation: Range extended to bras and tights. Exports to the Netherlands Production of high-end lingerie under private label
- 1981: Launch of the first brand, Marie Jo 1990: Van de Velde acquires German company PrimaDonna 1997: IPO on the Brussels Stock Exchange 1997: Launch of a third brand, Marie Jo L'Aventure 2001: Participation in the share capital of TopForm International, listed on the Hong Kong stock exchange 2002: Opening of first O&O store 2007: Strategic alliance with US multi-brand retail chain Intimacy Management LLC 2007: Launch of the Lingerie Styling programme
- 2008: Launch of sports lingerie line Marie Jo Intense 2008: Acquisition of Spanish lingerie firm Eurocorset and Spanish lingerie brand Andrés Sardá
- 2010: Launch of PrimaDonna Twist 2010: Majority 85% stake acquired in Intimacy USA 2010: Acquisition of Dutch retail chain LinCHerie 2011: Majority 87% stake in Rigby & Peller Ltd (UK) 2011: Joint-venture agreement with Getz Bros. to operate and develop Private Shop in China and Hong Kong
- 2012: Acquisition of Donker stores in the Netherlands
- 2013: Launch of PrimaDonna Swim
- 2014: Rigby & Peller celebrates its 75th birthday, 75 years of fitting room happiness
- 2014: Intimacy is now 100% owned by Van de Velde
- 2015: Lincherie wins the GfK Award for best lingerie store in the Netherlands for the second year in a row
- 2015: The Intimacy stores in the US get the Rigby & Peller brand name, look & feel
- 2015: 150th anniversary of PrimaDonna: celebrating curves since 1865
- 2016: Opening of Rigby & Peller Dubai in the Dubai Festival Mall
- 2017: Launch of PrimaDonna Sport
- 2018: Launch of Marie Jo Swim
- 2019: Sale of participation in Private Shop in China and Hong Kong to Getz
- 2019: Van de Velde celebrates its 100th anniversary
- 2022: Van de Velde, 25 years listed on the stock exchange Euronext Brussels
