= Gouy, Aisne =

Gouy
- Commune
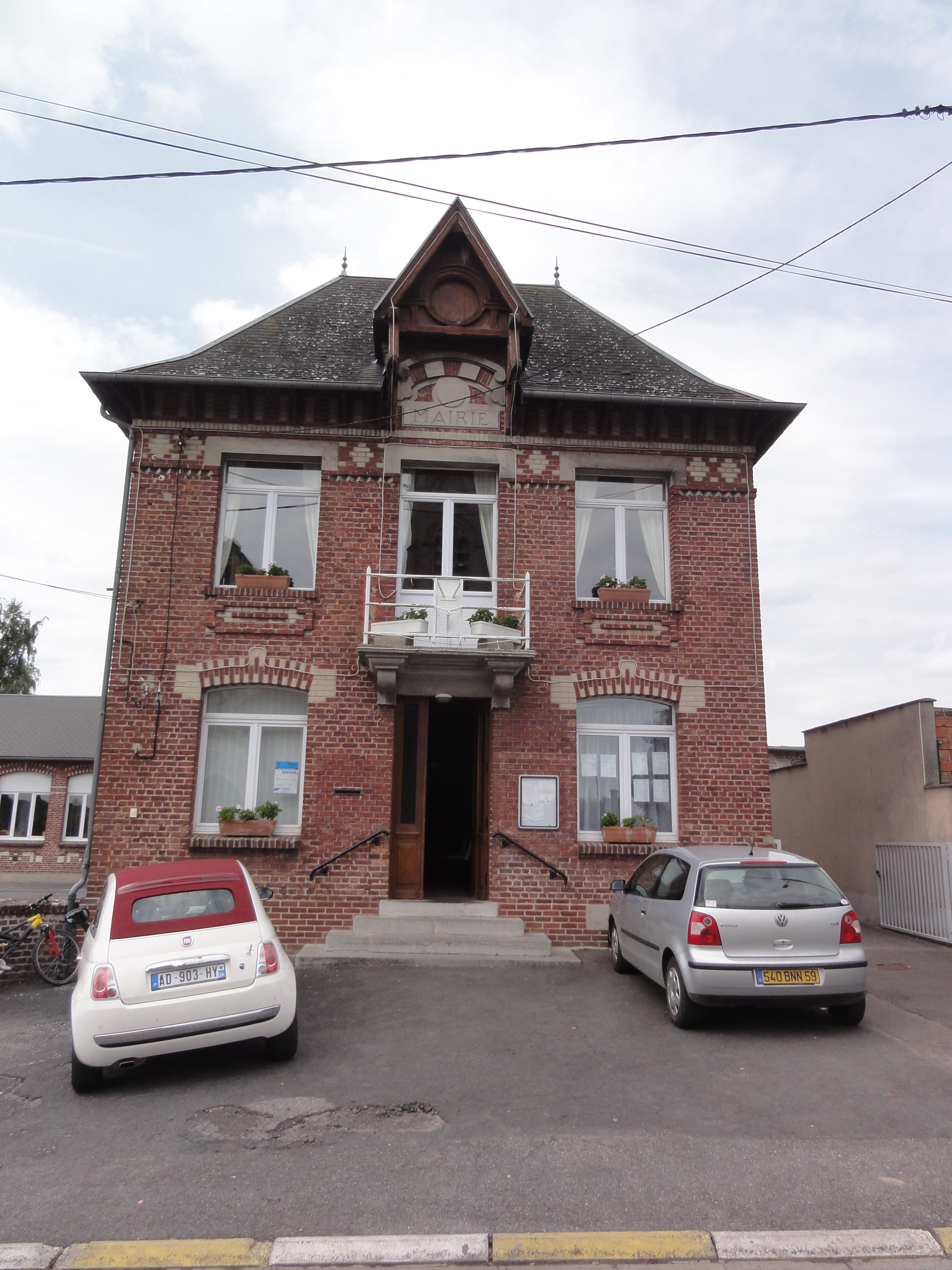
- The town hall of Gouy

- Coat of arms
- Location of Gouy
- Location within France Location within Hauts-de-France
- Coordinates: 50°00′09″N 3°15′20″E
- Country: France
- Region: Hauts-de-France
- Department: Aisne
- Arrondissement: Saint-Quentin
- Canton: Bohain-en-Vermandois
- Intercommunality: Pays du Vermandois

Government
  - Mayor (2026–32): Sophie Denizon
- Area^{1}: 17.6 km^{2} (6.8 sq mi)
- Elevation: 190 m (620 ft)
- Highest elevation: 150 m (490 ft)
- Lowest elevation: 87 m (285 ft)
- Population (2023): 572
  - Density: 32.5/km^{2} (84.2/sq mi)
- Time zone: UTC+01:00 (CET)
  - Summer (DST): UTC+02:00 (CEST)
- INSEE/Postal code: 02352 /02420
- ^{1} French Land Register data, which excludes lakes, ponds, glaciers > 1 km^{2} (0.386 sq mi or 247 acres) and river estuaries.

Gouy (French pronunciation: [ɡwi]; also Gouy-en-Arrouaise) is a commune in the Aisne department in the Hauts-de-France region of northern France.

== Population ==
Historical population
Year	Pop.	±% p.a.
1968	628	—
1975	694	+1.44%
1982	659	−0.74%
1990	641	−0.35%
1999	649	+0.14%
2007	615	−0.67%
2012	581	−1.13%
2017	560	−0.73%
2023	572	+0.35%
Source: INSEE

== See also ==
- Communes of the Aisne department
