= Bravissimo (company) =

British lingerie retailer

- Industry: Retail
- Founded: 1995; 31 years ago
- Headquarters: Warwick, United Kingdom
- Products: Lingerie, swimwear, nightwear, clothing
- Website: www.bravissimo.com www.bravissimo.com/us

Bravissimo is a lingerie retailer that provides lingerie in D-L cup sizes and swimwear in a D-L cup range. It has 26 stores across the UK, and also sells via mail order, online and via a US website. The company is based in Warwick, Warwickshire, and currently employs over 400 people.

== History ==
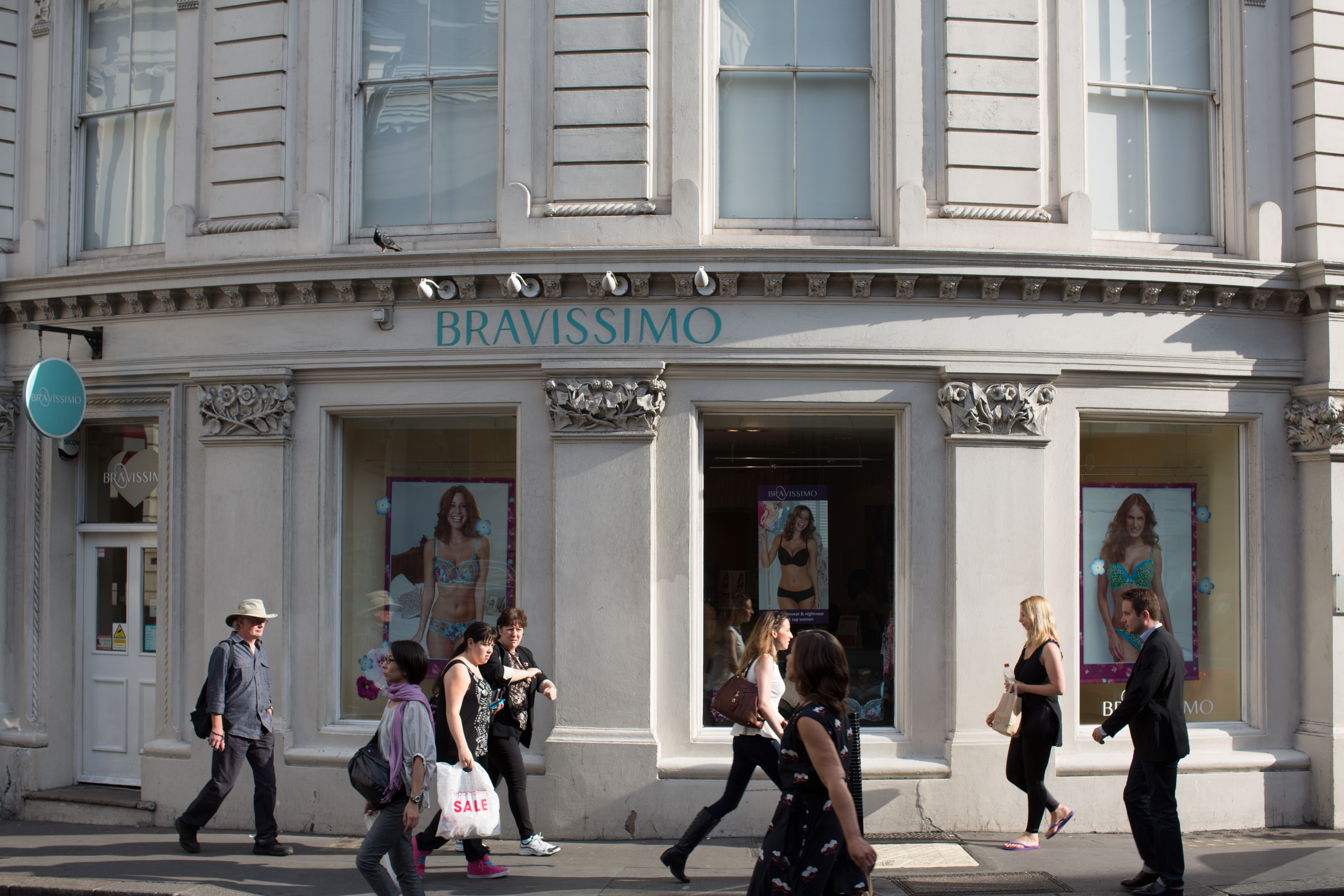
Bravissimo store

Founder Sarah Tremellen MBE began as a freelance TV and radio researcher for the BBC, quitting after eight months at the age of 25 to have a baby. Whilst pregnant, Tremellen found it difficult to find a good choice of bras that would fit her when she went up to a G Cup.

In 1995 after giving birth, Tremellen and her friend Hannah Griffiths tried to do something about it. They decided to take an eight-week business course which culminated in presenting a business plan to their local bank manager. Their presentation won them a £10,000 bank loan to help them start Bravissimo.

Working in the living room of Tremellen's Twickenham flat, they produced a mail-order catalogue that included all the best bras they could find, and created a mailing list of around 75 people - mostly friends and family. Tremellen then telephoned several women's magazines and newspapers, and within a month achieved coverage in the Daily Mail, bringing in 1,000 requests for a catalogue.

In 1996 they were able to move out of Tremellen's Twickenham flat and 12 months later Tremellen and her husband Mike bought Hannah Griffiths out of the business. In November 1999, Bravissimo opened its first shop in Ealing which remains one of the 16 stores nationwide they currently operate. The next year Mike Tremellen left his job at Tetley to become the business operations director.

In 2001 Bravissimo relocated to their headquarters in Leamington Spa.

In 2017, Bravissimo launched its US website and began looking for its first US shop site. In the same year sales grew by 2% to £50.2 million, but pre-tax profit decreased to £2.2 million from £3.3 million a year earlier, partly owing to spending on new shops.

Bravissimo sold a clothing range for a number of years, at one point employing the brand name Pepperberry, but the range was discontinued in 2021.

Also in 2021 Bravissimo launched a range of accessories including jewellery mugs and water bottles. The products failed to meet sales expectations and were soon discontinued with much of the remaining stock given away or put in staff kitchens. The way that Bravissimo collects reviews means that customers who bought the accessories were invited to rate them for comfort and true to size in the same way they are asked to rate lingerie and swimwear.

In 2022 Bravissimo relocated their headquarters to the current location at Athena Drive, which has a Warwick address.

In September 2024 Sarah and Mike Tremellen sold Bravissimo to Wacoal Europe, stepping away from the company entirely.

The New York store, Bravissimo's only physical presence in the United States, closed at the end of October 2024 after failing to break even.

In June 2025 there was a fire in Bravissimo's warehouse. The company paused online and telephone orders and was only able to sell stock which was already in, or en route to shops. Online and telephone orders resumed at the start of the following September.

== Awards ==
Bravissimo has been in The Sunday Times "100 Best Companies to work for" list for since 2007, when they came 19th; in 2018 they were awarded 13th place. The list rates a company's performance on eight key factors which takes into account things such as pay, leadership, social impact and personal growth. They were awarded 99th, 26th, 24th and 8th place respectively between 2008 - 2011. Bravissimo last appeared in the 100 Best Companies to work for list in 2020 and dropped out of the top 100 list in 2021, after which they stopped taking part in the survey. In 2011 Bravissimo was nominated for the Multiple Retailer of the Year award at the UK Lingerie Awards.

Sarah Tremellen was awarded an MBE in 2009 in the New Year’s Honours List for services to entrepreneurship. In 2017, Bravissimo won 'best multi-product E-tailer' at the Underlines Stars Awards. At the UK Lingerie Awards in 2018, Bravissimo won "Customer Service Provider of the Year", and Sarah Tremellen was awarded the UKLA Lifetime Achievement Award.
