= Gary Day (academic) =

Gary Day is a British academic and lecturer in English literature at De Montfort University, Leicester.

He has written books on F. R. Leavis, literary criticism and class, and is also co-editor (with Jack Lynch) for the Wiley Encyclopedia of Eighteenth Century Literature. Day held a satirical column in Times Higher Education for a number of years and now reviews television programmes for the same publication.

== Books ==
- Gary Day (15 November 1996). Re-Reading Leavis: Culture and Literary Criticism. Palgrave Macmillan. ISBN 978-0-312-16419-5.
- Gary Day (26 April 2001). Class. Routledge. ISBN 978-0-203-17757-0.
- Gary Day (2008). Literary Criticism: A New History. Edinburgh University Press. ISBN 978-0-748-61563-6.
- Gary Day; Bridget Keegan (7 September 2009). The Eighteenth-Century Literature Handbook. Bloomsbury Publishing. ISBN 978-1-441-16390-5.
- Gary Day (7 September 2010). Modernist Literature, 1890-1950. Pearson Longman. ISBN 978-1-408-20476-4.
- Gary Day (25 August 2016). The Story of Drama: Tragedy, Comedy and Sacrifice from the Greeks to the Present. Bloomsbury Academic. ISBN 978-1-408-18415-8.
