= Vijay Patel (businessman) =

Indian-English businessman (born 1950)

Vijay Patel OBE (born around 1950) is an Indian-English businessman. In the 2019 New Year Honours, Patel was appointed an Officer of the Order of the British Empire. The award drew criticism due to his company Atnahs increasing the prices of certain generic medications, resulting in considerable extra costs, totalling more than 16 million pounds, being incurred by the NHS in 2017.

He was born in Kenya and as of 2016 lives in Essex, England. He and his brother Bhikhu Patel started the pharmaceutical company Waymade Plc. The company Atnahs was started in 2013. Together with his brother in 2016 he was estimated to be worth 675 million pounds.

The Competition and Markets Authority found that Waymade and Auden Mckenzie had entered into anti competitive agreements in relation to the supply of hydrocortisone to the NHS. Auden Mckenzie paid Waymade to stay out of the market between 2011 and 2015 while it increased the price from around £46 to £90 for a pack of 30 20 mg tablets.
