= Nicolas Ruston =

British artist (born 1975)

- Born: 15 November 1975 (age 50); Epping, England
- Education: De Montfort University, Leicester.
- Known for: painting, sculpture, collage, conceptual art, installation art, video art

Nicolas Ruston (born 1975) is a British artist, "most recognized for his silicone and mixed media works, which explore the notion of artificial manipulation". He works in London and Norwich.

Ruston has exhibited internationally and his works are represented in private and corporate collections. He is a lecturer at Norwich University College of the Arts and is creative director of an advertising agency.

== Background ==
Ruston was born and grew up in North Weald near Epping, Essex. Ruston started painting in 1987, aged 12, and has been exhibiting work since 1996.

Ruston gained a BA in Design Management and Innovation at De Montfort University, Leicester, where he "became fascinated with semiotics and the social theory of advertising and marketing".

His art is informed by his experience in media industries, where image plays an integral part, "his past as a senior media creative and art director, whose job included "recreating the real", has fed into his...work in which he toys with the visual codes of mass media" (Jean-Robert Saintil, Dazed Digital, May 2010). He started as a Head Designer and from there moved into designing movie and pop video props, pre-production artwork, visualisation and graphics. He then entered into the ultimate world of image and manipulation – advertising. He has worked as an Art Director on brands such as Jaguar cars, Sky Television plc, Diesel clothing, Barclays, Virgin Group and the BBC.

== Artwork ==
Ruston has said about his own work, that he wants to "illustrate the difference between making love and pornography. I think that is a metaphor for the way people relate to the mass media".Neal Brown noted in his essay that, "Ruston has commanded the vast turmoil of meanings that attach to this subject be upended, spilling their moral and ethical complexities in a brazen exposure of orgiastic, entangled writhings, whose values he determines as variously humorous, sad or debased".

In an interview with Dazed Digital, Ruston states that, "our beliefs and values have increasingly become shaped by the things that we buy (or buy into) and equally how the things that we buy (or buy into) are cultivated as a response to our evolution as consumers. The media landscape is an environment that suckles us from infancy – a piece of packaging, or a jingle from an ad, can evoke as much nostalgia as a family photograph". (Jean-Robert Saintil, Dazed Digital, May 2010)

== Technique and style ==
Ruston works in a range of media, including painting, video and installation. "Image, text, moving image, and even supermarket shelves themselves, are employed by Ruston to make reference to the commercial, ideological and political devices that business applies, with its remorseless energy, to changing consumer behaviour". In some cases, Ruston has even incorporated other artist's work such as "'sculptures by Auguste Rodin amongst his own works, as an installation". Although his work is varying in nature, he has developed a number of techniques unique to his practice. These can be put into three distinct categories: Scratch-painting, Silicone-painting and Slice-painting.

== Selected exhibitions ==
Ruston's work has featured at Art Below exhibition's in the London Underground.

Deliver Us From Spin Ruston's work often compels us look more closely at the manufactured images we encounter every day. This was most notable in his solo show "Deliver Us From Spin". "Western Society has an obsession with image, an emphasis on presentation over substance, vanity over health, marketing and packaging over progressive science and spin over government policy".

The exhibition featured a work entitled "Bullies", painted onto a supermarket shelf. It portrayed a press clipping of Hitler combined with a headline from a celebrity gossip magazine. Much of the content featured in the show originated from found objects, including prostitutes' calling cards, litter from the streets, or from Ruston's extensive collection of newspapers and magazines. His work seems to delight in the very cultural images he subverts. However, any criticism is dryly neither confirmed nor dismissed, as noted in Ruston's interview for the exhibition catalogue: "It's difficult not to be a hypocrite when you're living in the belly of the beast".

"How Can I Steer You into The Maze of Where I Want You To Go Today?" by Nicolas Ruston (2007). Gloss and masonry paint on wood. H92 x W198 cm. Nicolas Ruston 2007

Viva Lolita

Ruston was selected for inclusion in the international group show, "Viva Lolita" curated by former British Museum curator James Putnam. In his review of the exhibition for Art Review, J.J.Charlesworth commented that, "Occasionally there are shows so off the mainstream artworld radar that they're worth noting". Advertising themes were inherent in Ruston's scratch painting entitled, "How Can I Steer You into The Maze of Where I Want You To Go Today?" 2007, which referenced the famous 'Hello Boys' Wonderbra campaign poster.

DE$IRE

An installation entitled "Euphoria", based on the notorious case of Joseph Fritzl that raised questions about the divisions between fiction and reality. His daughter Elisabeth's only window to the outside world, during her imprisonment by her father, was a television, and her offspring were nurtured on media.

The Sovereign European Art Prize

In 2010, Nicolas Ruston was shortlisted for the €25,000 Sovereign European Art Prize. Ruston's entry, a silicone painting entitled "Brave New World" was exhibited at The Barbican Centre. The painting "was inspired by an article published by The Independent newspaper, reporting the race by Japanese and American companies to acquire patents to human DNA sequences for future development and marketing". Ruston wanted to link this commodification of our common gene-pool to the changing representation of Nature in art by referencing "the artificial manipulation of natural products and the normalization of this process with the aid of the media and advertising".

Propensity Modelling

In 2011, Ruston launched "Propensity Modelling", a solo exhibition, hosted by The Hay Hill Gallery. The show featured a new collection, described by Galleries magazine as "powerful explorations in painting and video of mass media and modern myth". The show aimed "to draw out the complexities surrounding the packaging of DNA sequences and its value as commodity". It also featured sculptures by Auguste Rodin situated "amongst his own works, as an installation".

The show was a turning point for Ruston and, as Neal Brown noted in his essay, "Ruston's more recent work...reveals a deepened development...something more subtle and borderline. In these new works he seems interested in the contradictions that ensue when the high intentionality – the idealistic, pure love – that the image maker has for the creation and communication of an image, whether artist or advertiser, creates a genuine confusion between what is socially useful and what is socially useless".

== Charitable work ==
CHASE

In 2010, Ruston contributed original works of art to raise money for CHASE hospice care for children.

The Barbican Centre Trust

Ruston assisted with organising a pop-up show at The Club at The Ivy, London. The Sovereign Art Foundation donated a proportion of the proceeds raised from the culminating exhibition and auction to The Barbican Centre Trust, which delivers key arts programmes to local schools and members of the community.

De Montfort University

In July 2011, Ruston donated a large-scale silicone painting entitled "It all happened so slowly that most failed to realise that anything had happened at all" to De Montfort University, Leicester.
