= Bare Necessities (company) =

American lingerie, swimwear, and loungewear online retailer

- Industry: Apparel
- Founded: Avanel, New Jersey, U.S.
- Founder: Noah Wrubel & Bill Richardson
- Headquarters: Edison, New Jersey, U.S.
- Area served: United States, Puerto Rico, Guam, US Virgin Islands
- Key people: Noah Wrubel (CEO of Bare Necessities)
- Products: lingerie, swimwear, loungewear
- Revenue: $66 million
- Number of employees: 200+
- Parent: Delta Galil Industries (2020-current)
- Website: www.barenecessities.com

Bare Necessities is an American lingerie, swimwear, and loungewear online retailer which was established in 1998 in Avenel, New Jersey. The company claims to be the second largest online retailer in the industry next to Victoria's Secret with over $66 million in revenues.

In October 2018, Walmart acquired Bare Necessities, as part of its e-commerce strategy. In 2020, Walmart sold the company to Delta Galil Industries.

== Company history ==
Bare Necessities was founded in Avenel, New Jersey in 1998 by two Carnegie-Mellon graduates, Noah Wrubel and Bill Richardson. Wrubel's family already operated several lingerie stores of the same name since 1965 throughout New Jersey.

By 2006, the retailer set out to compete with Victoria's Secret with the help from Frog Design, A product design and branding firm best known for working with Apple. Their efforts paid off with consistent reported revenue increases and year over year growth.

Bare Necessities was acquired by Walmart in 2018 as part of its strategy to compete with Amazon in the online clothing space. In 2020, Walmart sold the company to Israeli clothing company Delta Galil Industries.

== Products ==
The online retailer carries an array of brands such as Bali, Wacoal, SPANX, Calvin Klein, Hanky Panky, Chantelle, Freya, Panache, Hanro, La Perla, Le Mystere, Ugg Australia, Wolford, Hugo Boss, Armani, and Polo Ralph Lauren. The company also carries over 200 bra sizes ranging from 28 to 56 inch bands and from an AA cup to N Cup. Bare Necessities ships throughout the United States and worldwide.

== Models ==
Unlike most of the online retailers in the late 1990s, Bare Necessities always used models, instead of mannequins. Many of Bare Necessities' catalog models have become popular from the site. Many models have parlayed their e-commerce success by landing gigs with Sports Illustrated and Victoria's Secret. These models include:

- Nina Agdal
- Natasha Barnard
- Brooklyn Decker
- Ashley Graham
- Jamie Gunns
- Jarah Mariano
- Juliana Martins
- Catrinel Menghia
- Lauren Mellor
- Genevieve Morton
- Sarah Mutch
- Candice Swanepoel
- Kate Upton
- Alina Vacariu
