= Indo-Jamaicans =

People who came from India to Jamaica

- Indo-Jamaicans preparing rice (c. 1890-96)

Total population
- 96,047

Regions with significant populations
- Portland, Westmoreland, Clarendon, Saint Andrew, Saint Catherine, Saint Mary, Kingston Parish

Languages
- Mostly Jamaican English/Patois (across all communities); Caribbean Hindustani (to lesser extent and spoken by the descendants of Jahajis as a heritage language): Sindhi; Gujarati; Punjabi; Kutchi; Bengali; Tamil; Telugu; Hindi-Urdu; other Indian languages; (spoken by more recent immigrants and their children)

Religion
- Hinduism · Christianity · Islam · Sikhism

Related ethnic groups
- Indo-Caribbean people · Indian people · Indian diaspora · Indo-Caribbean Americans · British Indo-Caribbean people · Indo-Fijians · Mauritians of Indian origin · Indian South Africans · South Asian diaspora

Indo-Jamaicans are the descendants of people who came from India and the wider subcontinent to Jamaica. Indians form the third largest ethnic group in Jamaica after Africans and Multiracials. They are a subgroup of Indo-Caribbean people.

== History ==
Due to deteriorating socioeconomic conditions in British India, more than 36,000 Indians came to British Jamaica as indentured labourers under the Indian indenture system between 1845 and 1917, mostly from Bhojpur and Awadh regions as well as other parts of North India. A significant minority were from South India. Around two-thirds of the labourers who came remained on the island. The demand for their labour came after the end of slavery in 1830 and the failure to attract workers from Europe. Indian labourers, who had proved their worth in similar conditions in Mauritius, were sought by the British Jamaican government, in addition to workers coming from China.

Indian workers were actually paid less than the ex-slaves, who were of West African origin. While slaves obviously were not paid for their labour, when they were emancipated in the 1830s, their wages were more than those given to Indian indentured servants. Indian immigrants therefore undercut the wages of the ex-slaves. Under the terms of their caste system, which valued light skin over dark, the Indian immigrants looked down on the emancipated africans, and considered them inferior. Relations between the two groups did not therefore begin on the best of footings. Indians were labeled the derogatory term, "coolie," based on their employment status. Despite such hardships, many Indians in Jamaica have retained their culture and religions like Hinduism and Islam.

The British Indian government encouraged indentured labour and recruiting depots were established in Calcutta and Madras, although agents were paid significantly less per recruit than for a European worker. Most Indians who signed contracts did so in the hope of returning to India with the fruits of their labour rather than intending to migrate permanently. The Indian Government appointed a Protector of Immigrants in Jamaica, although this office tended to protect the interests of the employers rather than the workers. Although technically the workers had to appear before a magistrate and fully understand their terms and conditions, these were written in English and many workers, signing only with a thumb print, did not comprehend the nature of their service.

In the mid-20th century, smaller numbers of Indians from the Sindh, Gujarat, Kutch, Bengal and Punjab regions came to Jamaica not as labourers but as merchants conducting business alongside Chinese and Arab immigrants.

Some Indians have married into the local population of Africans, Creoles, Chinese, Hispanics-Latinos, Arabs, Europeans, and Jews. Today the Indian population of Jamaica is either full-blooded Indian who are recent immigrants or their descendants, full-blooded Indians who are the descendants of the original indentured laborers, or mixed Indians, such as Douglas, Chindians, and Anglo-Indians.

When black and Indian women had children with Chinese men the children were called chaina raial in Jamaican English. The Chinese community in Jamaica was able to consolidate because an openness to marrying Indian women was present in the Chinese since Chinese women were in short supply. Women sharing was less common among Indians in Jamaica according to Verene A. Shepherd. The small number of Indian women were fought over between Indian men and led to a rise in the amount of wife murders by Indian men. Indian women made up 11 percent of the annual amount of Indian indentured migrants from 1845 to 1847 in Jamaica.

== Arrival in Jamaica ==
The first ship carrying workers from India, the "Maidstone", landed at Old Harbour Bay in 1845. It bore 200 men, 28 women under 30 years old and 33 children under 12 years old from various towns and villages in Northern India. The numbers arriving increased to 2,439 three years later, at which point the Indian Government halted the scheme to examine its working. The programme resumed in 1859 and continued until the outbreak of World War I, although by the 1870s stories of the hardships suffered by Indian indentured workers were causing disquiet on the subcontinent.

Two shillings and six pence were deducted from their meagre wages for the rice, flour, dried fish or goat, peas and seasoning which constituted their rations. Children received half rations but the plantation managers were warned to treat the children well, with quarterly medical checkups theoretically provided. The overwhelming majority of the immigrant labourers were Hindu but little provision was made for their faith and cultural practices. Non-Christian unions were not recognized until 1956 and many accepted Christianity and adopted English names. Higher caste Indians were prohibited from emigrating to the Caribbean so many did not give their family names as they embarked.

The conditions of the indenture varied from between one and five years, with the workers being released if they fell ill or bought themselves out of their contract. They were not allowed to leave the plantation without a permit, on pain of fines or even imprisonment. Many of the workers and their families suffered from yaws, hookworm, and malaria.

Starting in the 1930s, and accelerated by the Partition of India in the late 1940s-50s, another set of Indians came as free passengers to Jamaica to be entrepreneurs, businesspeople, and other professionals. They were mostly Sindhi Hindus who had fled persecution after their homeland of Sindh ended up in Muslim-majority Pakistan. Other Indians such as Punjabis, Gujaratis, Kutchis, Tamils, Telugus, and Bengalis also came in the mid-20th century till present-day to seek professional occupations.

== Surnames ==
The original Indentured labourers arriving in Jamaica during the mid to late 19th century mostly did not have surnames back in India. Once arriving in Jamaica, in order to assimilate easier into Jamaican society, they often took Anglo/British originated family names due to those being the majority in the country. However, some families took the names of the villages they came from in India and also their one name was used as the surname for their children.

Some Jamaican Indian surnames include Mangaroo, Babooram, Sirjue, Partab (Pratap), Calloo, Bhoorasingh, Mykoo, Dookan, Jaghai, Maragh, Ramlall, Ramdas, Rampersad, Singh, Harrisingh, Beharry, Bandoo, Siew, Santokie, Persad, Ameer, Amair, Mahabeer, Baboolal, Gopaul, Gopie, Nepaul, Kissoon, Bridgmohan, Setal, Badwah, Rambaran, Coomar (Kumar), Ali, Mohammed, Baccus, Hussaney and Lala, Sudgier, Golaub, Badaloo, Salabie.

== Settlement and repatriation ==
Although most of the workers originally planned to return to India, the planters lobbied the Government to allow them to stay and defray their settlement costs, largely to save on the costs of returning them to the Indian subcontinent. Money and land were used as incentives, with time expired Indians offered 10 or 12 acres (49,000 m^{2}) of Crown land.

The monetary grants were suspended in 1879, with the land grants being halted from 1897 to 1903 and abandoned in 1906 as there was little difference in the costs of repatriating a worker (£15 per person) and offering land grants of £12 per head.

== Problems in returning ==
The lack of ships available to repatriate the workers was another factor in many of them staying on. Ships refused to sail if not full, and at other times were oversubscribed, leading to some time expired workers being left behind. During World War I German submarine warfare and a lack of ships further cut the numbers able to return. The Indian Government did not encourage the return of workers as many were destitute, ill or had lost touch with their own culture.

The Indian workers tended their own gardens after the work on the plantations was done to supplement their diet. They introduced tamarind to the island, in addition to cannabis and the chillum pipe. Hindu festivals such as Diwali were celebrated although many became Christians over time. Gradually workers left the plantations for Kingston and took jobs that better utilized their existing and newly learned skills. The Indian community adopted English as their first language and became jewellers, fishermen, barbers, and shopkeepers.

== Impact on Jamaican culture and economy ==
Despite being a small percentage of the population, Indians have made an outsized impact on their adopted island nation by significantly contributing to its culture. They maintain their own cultural organizations that work for the benefit of the Indian community, while being assimilated into the wider Jamaican community in all facets of life. The once influence of the caste system has largely atrophied and arranged marriages are no longer common.

Indian jewellery, in the form of intricately wrought gold bangles, are common in Jamaica, with their manufacture and sale going back to the 1860s. During the first half of the 20th century, Indians such as the Jadusinghs owned several jewellery shops in Kingston specializing in pure 18-karat gold.

Alongside Hinduism, ganja was introduced to Jamaica from India. Hindu use of ganja for spiritual and medicinal purposes, including religious practices and sometimes recreation were adopted into Jamaican culture. The smoking of ganja has become a spiritual tradition by Rastafarians and is a central tenet in their way of life.

Indians have contributed to the culinary tapestry of the island as well. Foods, such as wrap roti, tarkaris, kitchrie, dhal bhat (dhal and rice), chokhas, curry goat, curry chicken, pholourie, and roti are popular, and seen as part of the national cuisine.

In 1995, the Government of Jamaica proclaimed May 10 Indian Heritage Day in recognition of the Indians' contribution to the social and economic development of the country. The arrival of the Indians more than 170 years ago is commemorated in stamps.

On March 1, 1998, the National Council for Indian Culture in Jamaica was formed. It is the umbrella organization of Indian associations with the mission to preserve and promote Indian culture.

== Notable Jamaicans of Indian descent ==
=== Notable Indo-Jamaicans ===
- Shaun Bridgmohan, jockey, first Jamaican in the Kentucky Derby
- Jean Lowrie-Chin, public relations practitioner
- Kamala-Jean Gopie, political activist
- Lee Gopthal, record label owner and promoter
- Henry W. Jaghai, author and community activist
- Rajiv Maragh, jockey
- Johnny Mykoo, chutney singer
- Tony Patel, veteran TV broadcaster
- Rajah Maragh, chef
- Ramesh Maragh, chef
- Luke Sital-Singh, musician

=== Notable Jamaicans of partial Indian descent ===
- George Ramocan, Senator and Jamaica High Commissioner to the UK
- Esther Anderson, actress
- Tanya S. Chutkan, Jamaican-American judge
- Five Star, R&B/pop group
- Jackie Mittoo, ska musician
- Amy Ashwood Garvey, activist
- Jamie Gunns, model
- Stuart Hall, cultural theorist
- Lester Holt, U.S. news anchor and journalist
- Diana King, R&B and dancehall artist
- Doreen Lawrence, campaigner and parliamentarian
- Marlene Malahoo Forte, attorney general
- Connie Mark, community organiser and activist
- Yendi Phillipps, winner of the Miss Jamaica World beauty pageant
- Krishmar Santokie, cricketer
- Edward Seaga, banker, businessman, politician and former Prime Minister of Jamaica
- Toni-Ann Singh, Miss World 2019
- Justine Skye, R&B singer
- Special Ed, rapper and producer
- Super Cat, dancehall artist
- XXXTentacion, rapper

== See also ==
- Indo-Guyanese
- Indo-Trinidadians and Tobagonians
- Indo-Caribbean
- Indo-Caribbean music
- British Indo-Caribbean community
- Indo-Caribbean Americans
- Indo-Canadians
- India–Jamaica relations
- Hinduism in Jamaica

== Sources ==
- Mansingh, L. and A. "The Indian tradition lives on", in A tapestry of Jamaica: The best of Skywritings, Air Jamaica's in-flight magazine. Kingston: Creative Communications Ltd. and Oxford: Macmillan Publishers. pp. 364–366.
- Mansingh, L. and A. "Indian heritage in Jamaica", The Jamaica Journal 10 (2,3,4): 10–19.
- Parboosingh, I.S. "An Indo-Jamaica beginning" The Jamaica Journal 18 (2): 2–10, 12.
- Sherlock, P. and Bennett, H. (1998) The story of the Jamaican people. Kingston: Ian Randle Publishers,
- Shepherd, V. "Transients to citizens: The development of a settled East Indian Community", The Jamaica Journal 18 (3): 17–21.
- Singhvi, H. M., ed. (2000), "Chapter 19. Other Countries of Central and South America" ( (PDF)), Report of the High Level Committee on the Indian Diaspora, Republic of India: Ministry of External Affairs, archived from the original on 2016-03-03.
