= Rampersaud =

Rampersaud is a surname. Notable people with the surname include:

- Mario Rampersaud (born 1992), Barbadian cricketer
- Raj Rampersaud, Canadian orthopedic surgeon

== See also ==
- Rampersad
