= Brayola =

Online lingerie retailer

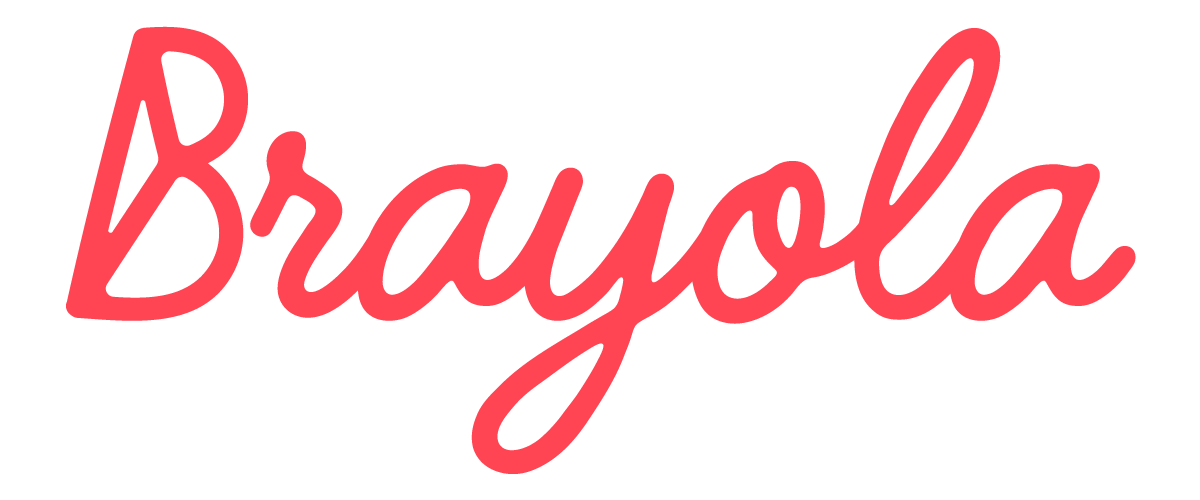
- Industry: Lingerie, Intimates
- Founded: 1 March 2013
- Founder: Orit Hashay
- Defunct: July 2021
- Fate: Merged with Bare Necessities
- Headquarters: New York City
- Products: Bras, intimates, lingerie, pajamas, swimwear, athletic wear, shapewear, panties
- Parent: Delta Galil
- Website: www.brayola.com

Brayola was an online lingerie retailer that helps shoppers find better-fitting bras. Its bra analyzer and extractor identify bras based on size, style, color, price, materials, purpose, quality and attributes. The information powers Brayola's engine to match shoppers with more bras that will fit in a similar way. In July 2021, parent company Delta Galil merged Brayola with Bare Necessities.

== History ==
Brayola was founded by Orit Hashay, the founder of Israeli wedding services review site, Mit4Mit, and Israeli local reviews site, Ramkol. Hashay came up with the idea for Brayola while pregnant to make bra shopping easier for herself and millions of women around the world.

Initially, Brayola developed a tool #bModel, which helped shoppers crowd-source feedback from its online community about whether a bra was a fit or not (with faces excluded for privacy). Later on, Brayola leveraged proprietary data to build an algorithm that matched shoppers with bras bought by other women with similar preferences, minimizing the need for returns due to sizing.

In December 2019, Brayola was acquired by holding company Delta Galil for $1.1 million. In July 2021, Delta Galil merged Brayola with another one of its holdings, online retailer Bare Necessities.

=== The Brayola Boutique ===
In 2016, Brayola launched the Brayola Boutique, a marketplace for independent designers.

=== Funding ===
Brayola raised $2.5 million in Series A funding from Firstime Venture Capital, Haim Dabah, HDS Capital Venture, and Jonathan Benartzi in February 2016. In 2017, Brayola received an additional $5 million for its Series A round of financing from The Firstime Fund, Ilan Shiloah, Nir Tralovsky, Jonathan Benartzi, Gett (formerly GetTaxi) founders Shahar Waiser and Roi More, and Haim Dabah.

=== Acknowledgements ===
Brayola was named to Internet Retailer's Hot 100 list after generating $10 million in sales in 2016, with a return rate of less than 8% and a conversion rate of over 5%.

Hashay has been recognized as one of Forbes’ 10 Female Founders to Watch in Israel and TechCrunch’s Three Israeli Femme-preneurs to Keep an Eye On in 2013. She was also listed as one of Globes Israel’s Top 50 Most Influential Women and top 100 Girls in Tech throughout Europe by Girls in Tech Network in 2012.
