= Kingsmead College =

Coordinates: 26.14535°S 28.04521°E

Location
- 132 Oxford Street, Melrose; Johannesburg, Gauteng; South Africa

Information
- School type: All-girls private school
- Motto: Franc ha Leal (Free and Loyal)
- Religious affiliation: Christian
- Established: 1934; 92 years ago
- Founder: Doris Vera-Thompson
- Sister school: St David's Marist, Inanda
- School district: District 9
- School number: 011 731 7300
- Headmistress: Mrs Lisa Palmer
- Exam board: IEB
- Grades: 000–12
- Gender: Female
- Age: 3 to 18
- Enrollment: 870 girls
- Campus: Urban Campus
- Campus type: Suburban
- Colours: Black; Green; White
- Nickname: Kingsmedians
- Rival: St. Andrew's School for Girls; St Mary's School
- School fees: R150,000 (tuition)
- Alumni: Kingsmead College Alumnae (KCA)
- Website: kingsmead.co.za

Kingsmead College is a private girls' primary and high school situated in Melrose, Johannesburg, Gauteng, South Africa. The school is located next to the Gautrain Rosebank Station. Kingsmead College caters for girls from Grade 000 to Grade 12 and has around 870 students.

== History ==
Kingsmead College was founded by Doris Vera Thompson in October 1933 and in 1934 opened its doors to 136 girls, from Grade 1 to Post-Matriculation.

Over the years, houses and gardens adjacent to the original property were purchased, providing further buildings needed to cater for a steadily increasing number of young girls coming to the school. Doris Vera Thompson helped to plan St Brigid's Chapel on the school grounds and she considered the simple building to be the “heart of the school.” From 1939 onwards, the Boarders used the Chapel regularly until 1999, when the Boarding House was closed.

Each class attends Chapel Assembly regularly during the term.

The chapel is open daily during the week from 07h00 to 17h00 and, on Sundays, it is used by the Kingsmead Christian Fellowship for Christian worship and prayer. Many Old Kingsmeadians return to the chapel for weddings and Christenings. The chapel is dedicated to St. Brigid.

== Organisation ==
Kingsmead College teaches Grades 000-Matric.

=== Junior School ===
The Junior School consists of Grades 1–7. Grades 1-6 wear a green checkered dress, with black school shoes, white socks, and a green blazer. A jersey is optional. Grade 7 wears the Senior School uniform of a blazer, white shirt, tartan skirt, white socks and black school shoes.

=== Senior School ===
Mrs Palmer is Headmistress of the Senior School (Grades 8–12). These grades wear a blazer, white shirt, tartan skirt, white socks and black school shoes.

== Affiliations ==
The school is a member of the Independent Schools Association of Southern Africa.

== Notable alumni ==
- Denise Scott Brown, architect
- Elizabeth de la Porte, harpsichordist
- Margaret Marshall, Chief Justice of the Massachusetts Supreme Judicial Court
- Topaz Page-Green, fashion model and the founder and president of the non-profit corporation The Lunchbox Fund
- Larraine Segil, entrepreneur, attorney, advisor, lecturer, author, board member and urban farmer
- Janet Suzman, actress
- Lauren Mellor, model
- Maureen Thelma Watson, politician
- Julia Vincent (2012) - South African diver
