= High Commission of India, Kingston =

Diplomatic mission of India to Jamaica

High Commission of India in Kingston
- Address: 5 Earls Ct, Acadia P.O. Box 446, Kingston-8, Jamaica(W.I)
- Jurisdiction: Jamaica, The Bahamas, Cayman Islands, Turks and Caicos Islands, British Virgin Islands
- High Commissioner: Mayank Joshi

The High Commission in Kingston is the diplomatic mission of India in Jamaica, and is concurrently accredited to The Bahamas, Cayman Islands, Turks and Caicos Islands and the British Virgin Islands. The current High Commissioner is Mayank Joshi.

The diplomatic mission is the local representative of the ICCR in Jamaica and is responsible for implementing its programs, sponsoring events such as free yoga sessions and film screenings.

== See also ==
- List of diplomatic missions of India
- Jamaica–India relations
