= Arnold Cooke =

British composer (1906–2005)

- Born: Arnold Atkinson Cooke; 4 November 1906; Gomersal, England
- Died: 13 August 2005 (aged 98); Five Oak Green, England

Arnold Atkinson Cooke (4 November 1906 – 13 August 2005) was a British composer, a pupil of Paul Hindemith. He wrote a considerable amount of chamber music, including five string quartets and many instrumental sonatas, much of which is only now becoming accessible through modern recordings. Cooke also composed two operas (still unperformed), six symphonies and several concertos.

== Education ==
Cooke was born at Gomersal, West Yorkshire, into a family of carpet manufacturers. As a child, Cooke learned to play the piano, and later the cello, and began composing by the age of 7 or 8. He was educated at Streete Preparatory School, Repton School and at Gonville and Caius College, Cambridge, where he read history, taking Part 1 of his Tripos in 1927, earning his B.A. He changed to read music with his composition teacher E. J. Dent. At Cambridge, Cooke continued to play the cello in the CUMS orchestra and in a string quartet. He was President of the Cambridge Musical Society from 1927 to 1928.

In 1929, he gained his Music degree and went to Berlin where he studied composition and piano at the Berlin University of the Arts under Paul Hindemith. Hindemith's composition class also included Harald Genzmer, Oskar Sala and Franz Reizenstein, the latter remained a lifelong friend and kept Cooke's Piano Concerto in his repertoire.

He later became musical director of the Festival Theatre at Cambridge, and in 1933 was appointed a professor at the Royal Manchester College of Music (now merged into the Royal Northern College of Music). In 1948, through the recommendation of E. J. Dent, he obtained a doctorate from Cambridge, submitting as his composition portfolio his Symphony No. 1 (1946–47), Piano Concerto (1939–40) and Sonata for viola and piano (1936–37).

== Career ==
Cooke moved to London in 1938 to further his career. In the 1930s, he carved out a reputation for himself as a promising young composer, and his music was taken up by leading interpreters. The harpist Maria Korchinska introduced his Harp Quintet in 1932; Sir Henry Wood conducted his Concert Overture No. 1 at the 1934 Promenade Concerts and the Griller Quartet premiered his String Quartet No. 1 in 1935. In 1936 Havergal Brian singled out for praise a cantata, Holderneth, a setting of a text by the American poet Edward Sweeney.

Louis Kentner and the BBC Symphony Orchestra conducted by Sir Adrian Boult premiered his Piano Concerto in 1943, which he had completed just before his call-up in 1941. The concerto had been commissioned by the South African pianist Adolph Hallis in 1939 but the outbreak of WWII meant that Hallis had to return to South Africa. Kentner gave the first performance in a BBC studio broadcast on 11 November 1943. The work received subsequent broadcast performances from Franz Reizenstein with the BBC Northern Orchestra under Clarence Raybould in 1952 and Eric Parkin with the BBC Northern Orchestra under Brian Priestman in 1972.

During the Second World War, he served in the Royal Navy, first in the aircraft carrier HMS Victorious, and subsequently as a liaison officer in a Norwegian escort vessel and a Dutch tug that took part in the D-Day Landings. After demobilisation he returned to London in 1946, becoming a founder member of the Composers' Guild of Great Britain. From 1947 until his retirement in 1978, he was Professor of Harmony and Composition at Trinity College of Music in London. After a stroke in 1993, he virtually ceased to compose, but lived to the age of 98, dying at his nursing home in Five Oak Green in Kent in 2005.

== Music ==
As a composer Cooke was highly productive and tended to work in traditional genres. His early music follows an English tradition with traces of Elgar, John Ireland and others, but this changes drastically from the time of his study with Hindemith. The music of the 1930s is far more stark, overtly contrapuntal and dissonant, but by 1937 is settling into a style which would essentially remain with him for most of his life. If the mature music shows the influence of Hindemith, Bartók and Shostakovich, it is also leavened with a more English sense of lyricism, whilst the shadow of Brahms is also present.

Cooke wrote two operas – Mary Barton (completed 1954) after the novel by Mrs. Gaskell and The Invisible Duke (1976). Neither has yet received a performance. The ballet Jabez and the Devil (1961) was a commission from the Royal Ballet. A suite from the ballet has been recorded. He composed six symphonies and several concertos, including two Clarinet Concertos (1956 and 1982), the first recorded. There are also recordings of four of the six symphonies (Nos 1, 3, 4 and 5), along with other orchestral works mostly issued on the Lyrita label. The sixth symphony finally received its first broadcast performance at the BBC studios in Salford on 7 September 2016, 32 years after it was completed.

His output of chamber music is copious, including a clarinet quintet, five string quartets, many instrumental sonatas, and some important vocal music. The Clarinet Quintet is available on Hyperion. The Pleyel Ensemble and MPR Records have issued a series of four CDs of chamber music recordings, the fourth of which was released in September 2020. Most of the works are recorded for the first time. The Bridge Quartet has recorded all five quartets. The organ music has been recorded by Tom Winpenny on Toccata.

== Selected works ==
=== Opera ===
- Mary Barton, Op. 27 (1949–54)
- The Invisible Duke (1976)

=== Ballet ===
- Jabez and the Devil, Op. 50 (1959) (Concert Suite: 1961)

=== Vocal and choral works ===
- Holderneth, Cantata (1933–34)
- Nocturnes, 5 Songs for soprano, horn and piano (1956)
- Songs of Innocence for soprano, clarinet and piano (1957)
- O Men from the Fields for unison voices (1961)
- Ode on St Cecilia’s Day for soli, chorus and orchestra, Op. 57 (1964)
- The Seamew for voice, flute, oboe and string quartet (1980)
- Five Songs of William Blake for baritone, treble recorder and piano (1987)

=== Orchestral music ===
- Concert Overture No. 1 (1934)
- Passacaglia, Scherzo and Finale for string orchestra (1937)
- Piano Concerto, Op. 11 (1940)
- Four Shakespeare Sonnets for Soprano and string orchestra (1941)
- Song for Tenor and small orchestra (1945)
- Concert Overture No. 2, Processional (1945)
- Symphony No. 1 (1947)
- Concerto in D major for string orchestra (1948)
- Prelude and Interlude from Mary Barton (1954?)
- Concerto for Oboe and string orchestra (1954)
- Clarinet Concerto No. 1 (1956)
- Concerto for Treble Recorder and string orchestra (1957)
- Violin Concerto (1958)
- Divertimento for Treble Recorder and string orchestra (1959)
- Concerto for small orchestra, Op. 48 (1960)
- Concert Suite from Jabez and the Devil (1961)
- Symphony No. 2 (1963)
- Variations on a Theme of Dufay, Ce Moi de May(1966)
- Symphony No. 3 (1967)
- York Suite for Recorders, string orchestra, timpani and percussion (1972)
- Cello Concerto (1973)
- Symphony No. 4 (1974)
- Symphony No. 5 (1979)
- Clarinet Concerto No. 2 (1982)
- Symphony No. 6 (1983–84)
- Repton Fantasia (1984)
- Concerto for Orchestra (1986)

=== Chamber music ===
- Octet for string quartet and woodwind, Op. 1 (1931)
- Suite for brass sextet (1931)
- Harp Quintet, Op. 2 (1932)
- String Quartet No. 1 (1933)
- Duo for Violin and Viola (1935, published A-AMP)
- Flute Quartet (1936)
- Sonata for Viola and Piano (1936–37)
- Sonata for Two Pianos (1937, published OUP)
- Sonata No. 1 in G for Violin and Piano (1939, published OUP)
- Sonata No. 1 for Cello and Piano (1941)
- Piano Trio in C (1941–44, published A-AMP)
- Variations on an Original Theme for String Quartet (1945)
- Alla Marcia for Clarinet and Piano, D38 (1946)
- String Quartet No. 2 (1947)
- Quartet for Oboe and String Trio (1948, published Novello)
- Quartet for Piano and String Trio (1948–49)
- String Trio (1950)
- Rondo in B♭ for Horn and Piano (1950)
- Sonata No. 2 in A for Violin and Piano (1951, published Novello)
- Sinfonietta for 11 Instruments, Op. 31 (1954)
- Arioso and Scherzo for Horn and Strings (1955)
- Sonatina for flute and Piano (1956 rev. 1961)
- Sonata for Oboe and Piano (1957, published Novello)
- Little Suite for Flute and Viola (1957)
- Suite for three B♭ Clarinets (1958)
- Sonata for Clarinet and Piano (1959)
- Divertimento for Treble Recorder and String Quartet (1959)
- Wind Quintet (1961)
- Suite for Treble Recorder and Piano (1961)
- Clarinet Quintet (1962)
- Sonata for Oboe and Harpsichord (1962)
- Quartet for Flute, Clarinet, Cello and Piano, D93 (1964)
- Quartet-Sonata for Recorder, Violin, Cello and Harpsichord (1964–65)
- Trio for Clarinet, Cello and Piano, D98 (1965)
- Suite for Recorder Quartet (1965)
- Serial Theme and Variations for Solo Recorder, Op. 65 (1966)
- String Quartet No. 3 (1967)
- Pavane for Flute and Piano, D112 (1969)
- Quintet for Piano and String Quartet (1969)
- Sonata for Solo Violin (1969, published Edition Peters)
- Quartet for Recorders (1970)
- Trio for Recorders (1970)
- Sonata for Harmonica and Piano (1970)
- Septet for Clarinets (1971)
- Septet for Wind and Strings (alternative to the above) (1971)
- Suite in C for Recorder Trio and Harpsichord (1972)
- Sonatina for Recorder Trio (1972)
- Divertimento for Flute, Oboe, Violin, Cello and Piano (1974)
- Divertimento for Descant Recorder, Treble Recorder, Violin, Cello and Harpsichord (alternative to the above) (1974)
- Variations on Two Christmas Carols for Recorder Trio (1975)
- String Quartet No. 4 (1976)
- Six Pieces for Treble and Tenor Recorders (1976)
- Concertante Quartet for Clarinets (1977)
- Quartet No. 2 for Recorders (1977)
- String Quartet No. 5 in one movement (1978)
- Suite for three Viols (1978–79)
- Prelude and Dance for Clarinet and Piano, D142 (1979)
- Sonata No. 2 for Cello and Piano (1980)
- Pieces for three Recorders (1981)
- Suite No. 2 for Recorder Quartet (1983)
- Trio for Oboe, Clarinet and Bassoon (1984)
- Capriccio for Recorder and Piano (1985)
- Sonatina for Alto Flute and Piano, D156 (1985)
- Arietta for Soprano Recorder and Piano (1986)
- Sonata for Bassoon and Piano (1987)
- Intermezzo for Oboe and Piano (1987)
- Sonata for Flute and Harp (1988)

=== Piano, Organ and Harpsichord music ===
- Three Pieces for Piano (Ostinato, Intermezzo and Capriccio) (1935)
- Sonata for 2 Pianos, Op. 8 (1936–37)
- Piano Sonata No. 1 (1938)
- Suite in C major for Piano (1943, rev. 1963)
- Scherzo for Piano (1957)
- Dance of the Puppets and Pastorale for Piano (1957)
- Prelude, Intermezzo and Finale for Organ (1962)
- Postlude for Organ (1962–64)
- Fantasia for Organ (1964)
- Toccata and Aria for Organ (1966)
- Impromptu for Organ (1966)
- Fugal Adventures for Organ (1967)
- Piano Sonata No. 2 (1965)
- Intermezzo and Capriccio for Harpsichord (1970–71)
- Sonata No. 1 in G for Organ (1971)
- Suite No. 2 for Piano (1975)
- Interlude for Organ manual (1976)
- Sonata No. 2 for Organ (1980)
- Suite No. 3 for Piano (1982)
- Arietta for Piano (1986)
- Tudeley Prelude for Organ (1989)
- Suite in G for Organ (1989)
