= Capel, Kent =

Hamlet in Kent, England

Coordinates: 51.1763°N 0.3376°E

Capel
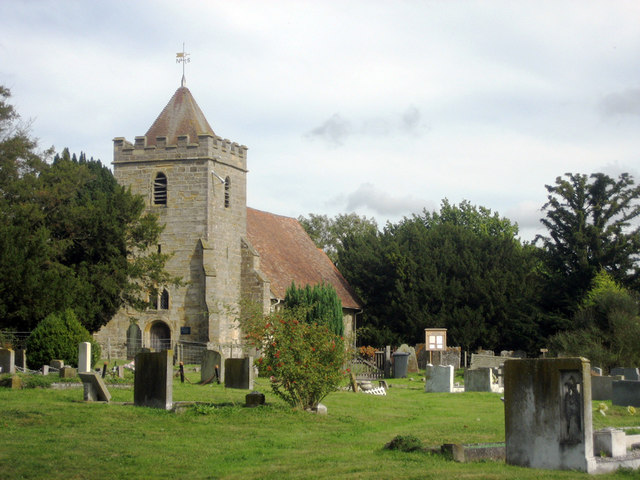
- Saint Thomas a Becket Church

- Location within Kent
- Population: 2,467 in Parish (2011 Census)
- OS grid reference: TQ635445
- Civil parish: Capel
- District: Tunbridge Wells
- Shire county: Kent
- Region: South East
- Country: England
- Sovereign state: United Kingdom
- Post town: Tonbridge
- Postcode district: TN12
- Dialling code: 01892
- Police: Kent
- Fire: Kent
- Ambulance: South East Coast
- UK Parliament: Tunbridge Wells
- Website: https://capel-pc.org.uk/

Capel is a hamlet and civil parish in the borough of Tunbridge Wells in Kent, England. The parish is located on the north of the Weald, 3 miles (4.8 km) to the east of Tonbridge. The southern part of the parish lies within the High Weald Area of Outstanding Natural Beauty, whilst most of the land also falls within the Metropolitan Green Belt. As well as Capel itself, the parish includes the communities of Castle Hill, Colts Hill, Five Oak Green, Postern, Tudeley and Whetsted.

== History ==
The name Capel may have derived from its church being a chapel of the nearby church at Tudeley.

The parish Church of St Thomas à Becket is now redundant, and in the care of the Churches Conservation Trust. Services are held there four times a year, and the church is open to visitors daily. It contains some lovely 12th century wall paintings depicting Cain and Abel, and Christ's entry to Jerusalem, originally there to help those who could not read learn the stories of the Bible. Outside is a yew tree under which Thomas Becket himself is supposed to have preached. The church tower was partly rebuilt following a fire in 1639.

The ecclesiastical parish is now known as Tudeley-cum-Capel with Five Oak Green.

== Government ==
Capel falls within the jurisdiction of Tunbridge Wells Borough Council. Capel ward is currently represented by a Liberal Democrat councillor, Hugh Patterson.

== Geography ==
Capel hamlet is 3.2 kilometres (2.0 mi) west of the nearest town, Paddock Wood, where there is a railway station, and 7.5 kilometres (4.7 mi) north-east of Tunbridge Wells. There are two main clusters of buildings, one around the church, Church Farm and Tanners Farm, at the junction of Alders Road and Church lane; and another around the Dovecot Inn, on Alders Road.

Hasted described Capel in the late 18th-century as being in:

...woody country, and is but little known or frequented, the surface of it is very low and flat, except in the middle of it, where there is a small rise, on which the church stands; here the soil is sand and stone, but in the rest of the parish it is a deep miry clay, the hedge rows broad, and filled with large and spreading oaks, which makes it exceeding gloomy. It is a wet place, full of ponds, and watered besides by two small streams, on the east and west sides of the parish, which runs from hence into the Medway...

— Edward Hasted

It has changed little since.

== Culture and Community ==
Capel also sports the Dovecote Inn, a fine traditional Kentish pub which received an award from CAMRA, The Campaign For Real Ale on 14 February 2009, marking the pub's inclusion in every edition of the Good Beer Guide for the previous 10 years.

== See also ==
- Listed buildings in Capel, Kent
