= Joyce Barker =

South African soprano

Joyce Barker (6 June 1931 – 23 May 1992) was a South African soprano.

Born in Mooi Rivier, a small town in Natal, she began training for a professional career with Daisy Holmes in Durban at the age of 19. She won the Ernest Whitcutt Memorial Cup three times consecutively and earned three different scholarships to support her musical education. One of these was awarded by the Royal Schools of Music and another by the NSAM (Natal Society for the Advancement of Music). With these scholarships, she continued her vocal training in London for three years. She made her professional debut in the United Kingdom in 1954 at the Canterbury Festival, singing the soprano part in Mendelssohn's oratorio Elijah.

In 1956, she became the first winner of the Kathleen Ferrier Award and left the United Kingdom for Europe, where she studied with Maria Hittorff, Paula Köhler, Borishka Gereb, Mario and Katerina Baziola for voice production, and Edouardo Pedrazolli for opera. In 1959, she won the gold medal at the International Concours de Chant, as well as several other prestigious awards during this period of her life.

Returning to the UK, she performed in several productions with Sadlers Wells and at the Royal Opera House which included major roles in Götterdämmerung and Die Walküre (Wagner), Mefistofele (Boito), and I Lombardi, Nabucco and Aida (Verdi). She also performed in Ireland for one season with roles in The Tales of Hoffmann (Offenbach), The Marriage of Figaro (Mozart), and La bohème (Puccini). During this period she also sang in Mahler's Eighth Symphony and Nielsen's Saul og David.

In 1963, Joyce Barker returned to South Africa, where she resumed her singing career in opera, oratorio and cantatas for the four provincial arts councils, as well as in broadcast media. She also made guest appearances at the Royal Opera House in the 1970s. Prof Piet de Villiers was one of her accompanists. Joyce Barker died in Johannesburg on 23 May 1992.
