= Larraine Segil =

South African-born entrepreneur (born 1947)

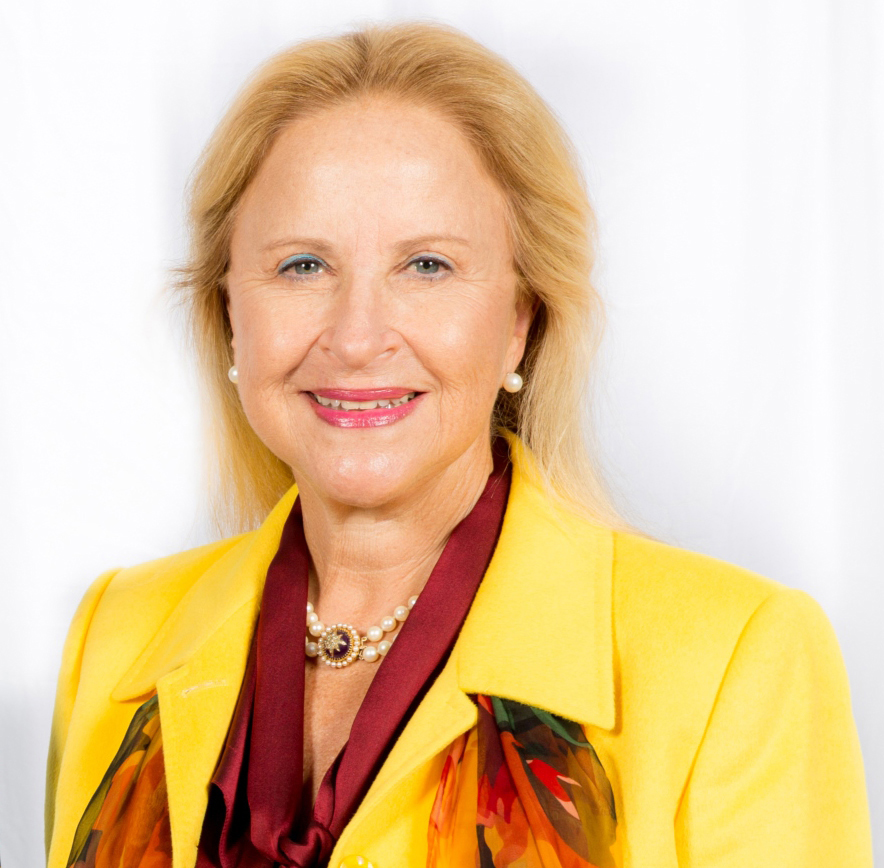
- Born: Larraine Diane Wolf; June 14, 1947 (age 78); Johannesburg, South Africa
- Education: University of Witwatersrand (BA, BA); Pepperdine University (MBA); Southwestern Law School (JD)
- Occupations: Founder Chair and CEO, EWA The Exceptional Women Awardees Foundation, CEO, The Little Farm Company
- Years active: 2012-present
- Organization(s): Frontier Communications NASDAQ: FTR, World Health Organization (2009), C200 Foundation, APCO Worldwide International Advisory Council, IC² Institute at the University of Texas at Austin, Entrepreneurs Board for the UCLA Anderson School of Management, Exceptional Women Awardees Foundation Founder Chair and CEO, CalPrivate Bank Board Director Chair Nom and Gov and Compensation Committees
- Spouse: Clive Segil
- Website: www.ExceptionalWomenAwardees.com, www.lsegil.com, http://rockingrandmamusic.com/

Larraine D Segil (née Wolf; born June 14, 1947) is a South African-born entrepreneur, attorney, advisor, lecturer, author, board member and urban farmer. She is CEO of The Little Farm Company, a Los Angeles-based family holding company that was mentioned in Forbes magazine. Segil has been a commentator for CNN and CNBC and has been featured in Fast Company magazine and Bloomberg Business.

Segil is CEO of the Exceptional Women Awardees Foundation, past chair of the C200 Foundation, and past vice chair of the C200 Governing Board, a global nonprofit group of women executives, and a member of the APCO Worldwide International Advisory Council (IAC). She was for 13 years a member of the Board of Frontier Communications and formerly on the advisory board of Edgecast, a content delivery network (CDN) company, which sold to Verizon in 2013. In 2009, Segil was appointed to the board of the World Health Organization (WHO) Tropical Diseases Group (TDR), in Geneva, Switzerland, where she served for three years.

== Early life and education ==
Segil was born in South Africa and immigrated to the United States in 1974. She attended Kingsmead College, and the University of Witwatersrand in Johannesburg, South Africa, where she obtained a B.A. degree in Latin and English and a B.A. Honors degree in Latin and Classics. In the United States, Segil obtained a J.D. from Southwestern Law School and a M.B.A. from the Presidential Key Executive Program Pepperdine University. She is admitted to practice law in the State of California and to the Supreme Court of the United States.

== Career ==
In the 1970s, Segil began her American business career selling dental equipment as a telemarketer. She co-founded a financial services company and worked with her husband, Clive Segil, an orthopedic surgeon, to establish one of the first 24/7 urgent care clinics in America near the Burbank, California, airport.

In the 1980s, Segil was CEO of an advanced materials company providing products and services to aerospace and electronics manufacturers worldwide. Her client list included Lockheed Martin, Hughes Aircraft Company and the governments of France and Israel.

In 1987, Segil started The Lared Group, with Emilio Fontana joining her soon after in Los Angeles, California, a firm that advised on alliances for large and small companies around the world. Segil led The Lared Group for 24 years, before it was acquired by consulting firm Vantage Partners LLC. In 2003, Segil became a full partner and board member of Vantage Partners, LLC, a business strategy consulting firm, until 2006. She advised on the creation and management of business alliances to Global 1000 and Fortune 500 companies such as Cisco, Intel, and Synopsys Inc. and also advised on how to partner with startup companies. In 2007, Segil became partner emeritus at Vantage Partners.

Segil lectured on alliances and partnerships to executives around the world and taught a course on strategic alliances at the California Institute of Technology for executives for 24 years. She has contributed strategic alliance know-how to multiple journalists, academics and authors, including in the Melanie Haiken article Innovative Partnering: How smart alliances lend a hand to help midmarket growth, which was featured in Business 2.0 magazine and CNN Money.

Segil has authored five books on alliances and leadership, published by Random House, John Wiley and Sons and AMACOM, and in addition authored a novel published by Penguin Books.

== Other activities ==
In 1991, Segil became a senior research fellow at the IC^{2} Institute at the University of Texas at Austin. She joined the Frontier Communications Corporation Board of Directors in March 2005. Segil was appointed by TDR, the Special Programme for Research and Training, to be a member of the Strategic Alliances Advisory Group which was co-sponsored by UNICEF, United Nations Development Programme, the World Bank and the World Health Organization from 2009 to 2012. The program helped foster a global research effort on infectious diseases of poverty. Segil serves on the board of trustees of Southwestern School of Law in Los Angeles, and on the Price Center Entrepreneurial Advisory Board of the Anderson School of Management of UCLA since 1993.

Segil created a scholarship for ninth-grade girls at Kingsmead College in Johannesburg and established endowments for women professionals at Southwestern Law School and Pepperdine University Graziadio School of Business and Management.

In 2007, Segil left the full-time corporate environment to become CEO and co-founder with Clive Segil of The Little Farm Company, a two-acre urban farm outside Los Angeles, California. The company produces cheeses, jams, relishes and organic produce.

In 2011, Segil wrote and co-composed a box set of children's CDs followed by a children's cookbook under the name Rockin' Grandma Music.

In 2012, Segil began mentoring high level women executives and in 2017 created a 501C3 Public Charity Foundation which she now runs called the Exceptional Women Awardees Foundation as a volunteer. It is a lifetime-membership mentoring program. In 2022, the group exceeded 100 women leaders.

== Bibliography ==
- Dynamic Leader Adaptive Organization: Ten Essential Traits for Managers by Larraine Segil (April 18, 2002)
- Partnering: The New Face of Leadership by Larraine Segil, Marshall Goldsmith and James Eds Belasco (October 31, 2002)
- Measuring the Value of Partnering: How to Use Metrics to Plan, Develop, and Implement Successful Alliances by Larraine Segil (April 22, 2014)
- Intelligent Business Alliances: How to Profit Using Today's Most Important Strategic Tool by Larraine D. Segil (December 8, 2010)
- Belonging by Larraine Segil (August 28, 2000)
- FastAlliances: Power Your E-Business. by Larraine Segil (December 22, 2000)
- Intelligent Business Alliances How to Profit Using Today's Most Important Strategic Tool by Larraine Segil (1996)
- Leading Authorities On Business: Winning Strategies from the Greatest Minds in Business Today (2002)
- "Understanding Life Cycle Differences" (brief article): An article from: Association Management by Larraine Segil (July 28, 2005)
