= Church of St Thomas à Becket, Capel =

Coordinates: 51.1764°N 0.3410°E

Church of St Thomas Becket, Capel
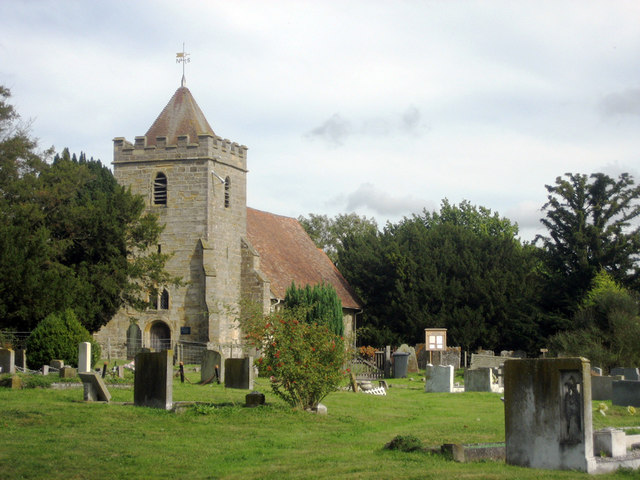
- Church of St Thomas Becket, Capel, from the southwest

- Location in Kent
- OS grid reference: TQ 637 445
- Location: Capel, Kent
- Country: England
- Denomination: Anglican
- Website: Churches Conservation Trust

History
- Dedication: Thomas Becket

Architecture
- Functional status: Redundant
- Heritage designation: Grade I
- Designated: 20 October 1954
- Architectural type: Church
- Style: Norman, Gothic, Gothic Revival

Specifications
- Materials: Sandstone, partly rendered Roof tiled

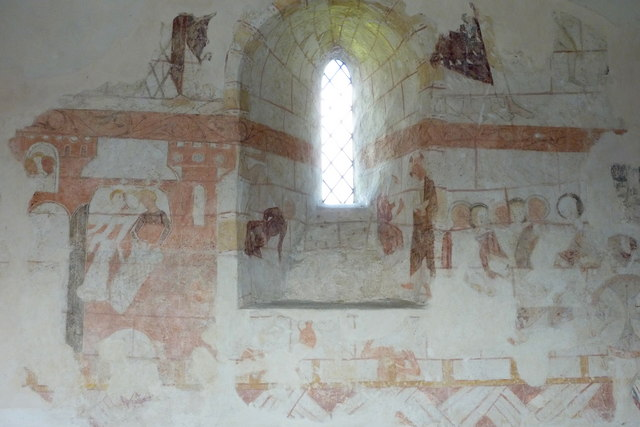
Wall paintings

The Church of St Thomas Becket is a redundant Anglican church in the village of Capel, Kent, England. It is recorded in the National Heritage List for England as a designated Grade I listed building, and is under the care of the Churches Conservation Trust. Capel is located 4 miles (6 km) east of Tonbridge, off the B2017 road. It is said that Thomas Becket preached either in the church, or under a yew tree in the churchyard.

== History ==
The church originated in the Norman era. The chancel arch dates from the 13th century, and the tower and the nave from the 14th or early 15th century. Alterations were made in the 16th century. There was a fire in the tower in 1639, and it had to be partly rebuilt. The chancel and the south wall were refurbished during the 19th century. The church was vested in the Churches Conservation Trust on 8 July 1986. It is open daily for visitors.

== Architecture ==
=== Exterior ===
The church is constructed in sandstone, and the chancel and north wall have been rendered. The roof is tiled. The plan of the church is simple, consisting of a nave, a chancel with a north vestry, and a relatively large but short tower, through which the church is entered. The tower is in a single stage, and stands on a moulded plinth. It has diagonal buttresses, a battlemented parapet, and a pyramidal roof surmounted by a 20th-century cast iron weathervane. The bell openings are lancets and are louvred, with slit openings beneath them. On the west face of the tower is a plain round-headed doorway, with a double-lancet window above it. In the south wall of the nave are four two- or three-light windows, and in the north wall are two lancet windows. In the south wall of the chancel is a priest's door. The east window dates from the 19th century and is in Early English style.

=== Interior ===
Inside the tower is a porch and a timber staircase. The walls of the interior of the church are lime-washed, and the floors are tiled. On the north wall of the nave are wall paintings probably dating from the 13th century. They depict biblical scenes, including Cain and Abel and Christ's entry into Jerusalem. They were discovered in 1927 by Professor E W Tristram and restored by Mrs Eve Baker and Mr John Dives. Towards the west end of this wall is a niche. The chancel contains a 20th-century stone altar. The communion rails are dated 1662. The oak pulpit dates from the 19th century. The stone font is probably medieval, and consists of an octagonal bowl on a cylindrical shaft. Apart from brass plaques commemorating those who died in the World Wars, the only memorial in the church is a plain marble plaque dated 1834. Above the tower arch is a board painted with the royal arms. Also on the west wall are further boards inscribed with the Lord's Prayer and the Ten Commandments. The stained glass in the east window is dated 1905, and depicts Christ the King, reigning from the cross, and flanked by his mother and St John. It is the work of Horatio Walter Lonsdale.

A "St Cecilia" organ by Thomas S. Jones & Son was installed in 1925. At an unknown date, this was removed, and replaced with a reed organ. In turn, the reed organ was replaced in 1990 by another St Cecilia organ, which had been removed from All Saints' Church, Tudeley in Kent.

== External features ==
In the churchyard are two chest tombs and 15 headstones, each of which has been designated as a Grade II listed building. One chest tomb is anonymous and dates from the 16th or 17th century. The inscription on the other tomb is illegible, but it is dated 1768. The named single headstones are to Jane and Samuel Brook, dated 1781, to Elizabeth Daniel, dating from the 17th century, to Thomas Larkin and his wife, dated 1769, to John Larkin, dated 1753, to John Millesden, dated 1758, to Elizabeth Relph, dated 1759, to Ann Town dated 1732, and to Ambrose Vineen and his wife, dated 1784. There are pairs of headstones to the Hubble family, dating from the middle of the 18th century, to the Kipping family dated from the 1680s, and to the Mills family from the late 18th century. There are also four illegible or anonymous single headstones. Adjacent to the churchyard is cemetery which is still in use, and the burials have been catalogued and listed for both the old and new churchyard. The new churchyard includes the burial of Mary Hewitt, a 27 year-old victim of the 1943 Bethnal Green Underground disaster.

== See also ==
- List of churches preserved by the Churches Conservation Trust in Southeast England
- List of places of worship in Tunbridge Wells (borough)
- List of burials in the Church of St Thomas a Becket, Capel
