= Listed buildings in Capel, Kent =

Civil Parish in Kent, England

Capel is a village and civil parish in the Borough of Tunbridge Wells of Kent, England. It contains 116 listed buildings that are recorded in the National Heritage List for England. Of these three are grade I, four are grade II* and 109 are grade II.

This list is based on the information retrieved online from Historic England.

== Key ==
Grade	Criteria
I	Buildings that are of exceptional interest
II*	Particularly important buildings of more than special interest
II	Buildings that are of special interest

== Listing ==
Name	Grade	Location	Type	Completed (Note: The date given is the date used by Historic England as significant for the initial building or that of an important part in the structure's description.)	Date designated	Grid ref. (Note: The grid reference is based on the British national grid reference system, sometimes known as OSGB36, used by the Ordnance Survey.) Geo-coordinates	Notes	Entry number (Note: The "List Entry Number" is a unique number assigned to each listed building and scheduled monument by Historic England.)	Image	Wikidata
Barham House	II	Alders Road			24 August 1990	TQ6295544679; 51°10′41″N 0°19′48″E		1251197	Upload Photo	Q26543181
Reeds Farm Cottages	II	Alders Road			24 August 1990	TQ6438143938; 51°10′16″N 0°21′00″E		1262880	Upload Photo	Q26553723
The Bailiffs House	II	Alders Road	house		24 August 1990	TQ6454043869; 51°10′13″N 0°21′08″E		1251196	The Bailiffs House More images	Q26543180
Former Stables Approximately 60 Metres South of Badsell Manor Farmhouse	II	2, Badsell Barns, Badsell Road, Five Oak Green, TN12 6QR			24 August 1990	TQ6573444677; 51°10′38″N 0°22′11″E		1262883	Upload Photo	Q26553726
Badsell Manor Farmhouse	II	Badsell Road			20 October 1954	TQ6578344728; 51°10′40″N 0°22′13″E		1251200	Upload Photo	Q26543184
Badsells Mains Farmhouse	II	Badsell Road, Five Oak Green, Tonbridge, TN12 6QU			24 August 1990	TQ6536544803; 51°10′43″N 0°21′52″E		1251198	Upload Photo	Q26543182
Barn Approximately 5 Metres North West of Mill House	II	Badsell Road			24 August 1990	TQ6547044773; 51°10′42″N 0°21′57″E		1262882	Upload Photo	Q26553725
Boundary Wall Approximately 100 Metres South West of Badsell Manor Farmhouse	II	Badsell Road			24 August 1990	TQ6571544693; 51°10′39″N 0°22′10″E		1251201	Upload Photo	Q26543185
Former Oasthouse Approximately 140 Metres South South West of Badsell Manor Farmhouse	II	Badsell Road, Five Oak Green, TN12 6QR			24 August 1990	TQ6573644641; 51°10′37″N 0°22′11″E		1251202	Upload Photo	Q26543186
Ivy Cottages	II	Badsell Road, Five Oak Green			24 August 1990	TQ6489545307; 51°11′00″N 0°21′29″E		1251203	Upload Photo	Q26543187
Mill House Including Front Boundary Railings	II	Badsell Road			24 August 1990	TQ6548044764; 51°10′41″N 0°21′58″E		1251199	Upload Photo	Q26543183
The Cottage	II	Badsell Road, Five Oak Green			17 April 1989	TQ6490345304; 51°10′59″N 0°21′29″E		1262885	Upload Photo	Q26553728
The Supply Stores	II	Badsell Road, Five Oak Green			24 August 1990	TQ6486645315; 51°11′00″N 0°21′27″E		1262884	Upload Photo	Q26553727
9 and 10, Bampton Bank	II	9 and 10, Bampton Bank			24 August 1990	TQ6318044882; 51°10′48″N 0°20′00″E		1251204	Upload Photo	Q26543188
Lake Bridge	II	Castle Hill, Somerhill Park			24 August 1990	TQ5988544987; 51°10′54″N 0°17′10″E		1251207	Upload Photo	Q26543191
Lake Cottage	II	Castle Hill, Somerhill Park			24 August 1990	TQ6000444974; 51°10′54″N 0°17′16″E		1251244	Upload Photo	Q26543226
Top Lodge Including Front Boundary Fence	II	Castle Hill, Somerhill Park			24 August 1990	TQ6079544228; 51°10′29″N 0°17′56″E		1262887	Upload Photo	Q26553730
Anonymous Chest Tomb Approximately 1.5 Metres South of the Nave of the Church of St Thomas A Becket	II	Church Lane			24 August 1990	TQ6375744515; 51°10′35″N 0°20′29″E		1251245	Upload Photo	Q26543227
Anonymous Headstone Approximately 15 Metres West North West of the Tower of the Church of St Thomas A Becket	II	Church Lane			24 August 1990	TQ6371144513; 51°10′35″N 0°20′26″E		1251252	Upload Photo	Q94994296
Barn Approximately 20 Metres East of Church Farmhouse	II	Church Lane			24 August 1990	TQ6380944463; 51°10′33″N 0°20′31″E		1251309	Upload Photo	Q26543281
Brook Headstone Approximately 9 Metres South East of the Chancel of the Church of St Thomas A Becket	II	Church Lane			24 August 1990	TQ6375844508; 51°10′35″N 0°20′29″E		1251246	Upload Photo	Q26543228
Church Farmhouse	II	Church Lane	farmhouse		24 August 1990	TQ6377844482; 51°10′34″N 0°20′30″E		1251254	Church Farmhouse More images	Q26543232
Church of St Thomas A Becket	I	Church Lane	church building		20 October 1954	TQ6373444513; 51°10′35″N 0°20′28″E		1262867	Church of St Thomas A Becket More images	Q5117739
Daniel Headstone Approximately 10 Metres South East of the Chancel of the Church of St Thomas A Becket	II	Church Lane			24 August 1990	TQ6375744505; 51°10′35″N 0°20′29″E		1251247	Upload Photo	Q26543229
Granary Approximately 5 Metres West of Tanners Farmhouse	II	Church Lane	granary		24 August 1990	TQ6380844538; 51°10′36″N 0°20′31″E		1251310	Granary Approximately 5 Metres West of Tanners Farmhouse More images	Q26543282
Illegible Chest Tomb Approximately 9 Metres East of the Chancel of the Church of St Thomas A Becket	II	Church Lane			24 August 1990	TQ6375544519; 51°10′35″N 0°20′29″E		1262868	Upload Photo	Q26553714
Illegible Headstone Approximately 5 Metres South East of the Chancel of the Church of St Thomas A Becket	II	Church Lane			24 August 1990	TQ6375144506; 51°10′35″N 0°20′28″E		1262855	Upload Photo	Q94994300
Illegible Headstone Approximately 6 Metres South East of the Chancel of the Church of St Thomas A Becket	II	Church Lane			24 August 1990	TQ6375044508; 51°10′35″N 0°20′28″E		1251253	Upload Photo	Q94994298
Illegible Headstone Approximately 9 Metres South of the Nave of the Church of St Thomas A Becket	II	Church Lane			24 August 1990	TQ6373544498; 51°10′35″N 0°20′28″E		1262843	Upload Photo	Q94994295
Larkin Headstone Approximately 5.5 Metres East of the Chancel of the Church of St Thomas A Becket	II	Church Lane			24 August 1990	TQ6375444514; 51°10′35″N 0°20′29″E		1251248	Upload Photo	Q26543230
Larkin Headstone Approximately 9 Metres South of the Chancel of the Church of St Thomas	II	Church Lane			24 August 1990	TQ6374344503; 51°10′35″N 0°20′28″E		1262869	Upload Photo	Q26553715
Millesden Headstone Approximately 1.5 Metres East of the Vestry of the Church of St Thomas A Becket	II	Church Lane			24 August 1990	TQ6374544519; 51°10′35″N 0°20′28″E		1251274	Upload Photo	Q26543249
Oasthouse Approximately 20 Metres East of Tanners Farmhouse	II	Church Lane	hop kiln		24 August 1990	TQ6385344534; 51°10′36″N 0°20′34″E		1251311	Oasthouse Approximately 20 Metres East of Tanners Farmhouse More images	Q26543283
Orchard Cottage	II	Church Lane			24 August 1990	TQ6383244834; 51°10′45″N 0°20′33″E		1262824	Upload Photo	Q26553676
Pair of Hubble Headstone Approximately 3.5 Metres East of the Chancel of the Church of St Thomas A Becket	II	Church Lane			24 August 1990	TQ6374944515; 51°10′35″N 0°20′28″E		1262841	Upload Photo	Q94994290
Pair of Kipping Headstones Approximately 2.5 Metres East of the Vestry of the Church of St Thomas A Becket	II	Church Lane			24 August 1990	TQ6374744518; 51°10′35″N 0°20′28″E		1262870	Upload Photo	Q94994292
Pair of Mills Headstones Approximately 9 Metres South of the Nave of the Church of St Thomas A Becket	II	Church Lane			24 August 1990	TQ6373444501; 51°10′35″N 0°20′28″E		1251249	Upload Photo	Q94994294
Ralph Headstone Approximately 4.5 Metres South of the Chancel of the Church of St Thomas A Becket	II	Church Lane			24 August 1990	TQ6374344506; 51°10′35″N 0°20′28″E		1251250	Upload Photo	Q26543231
Tanners Farmhouse	II	Church Lane	farmhouse		24 August 1990	TQ6382444536; 51°10′36″N 0°20′32″E		1262823	Tanners Farmhouse More images	Q26553675
Town Headstone Approximately 5 Metres South South East of the Chancel of the Church of St Thomas A Becket	II	Church Lane			24 August 1990	TQ6374644506; 51°10′35″N 0°20′28″E		1251276	Upload Photo	Q94994288
Vineen Headstone Approximately 7 Metres South East of the Chancel of the Church of St Thomas A Becket	II	Church Lane			24 August 1990	TQ6374844505; 51°10′35″N 0°20′28″E		1251251	Upload Photo	Q94994289
Colts Hill Farmhouse	II	Colts Hill			24 August 1990	TQ6502844064; 51°10′19″N 0°21′33″E		1261385	Upload Photo	Q26552341
Badsell Park Farmhouse	II	Crittenden Road			24 August 1990	TQ6506743371; 51°09′57″N 0°21′34″E		1254228	Upload Photo	Q26545911
Oasthouse Immediately North West of Badsell Park Farmhouse	II	Crittenden Road			24 August 1990	TQ6508843390; 51°09′57″N 0°21′35″E		1261386	Upload Photo	Q26552342
Crockhurst Farm Cottages	II	1 and 2, Crockhurst Street, Tudeley	cottage		24 August 1990	TQ6216445078; 51°10′55″N 0°19′08″E		1262825	Crockhurst Farm Cottages More images	Q26553677
Crockhurst Street Cottages	II	1-4, Crockhurst Street, Tudeley	cottage		24 August 1990	TQ6217345113; 51°10′56″N 0°19′08″E		1251313	Crockhurst Street Cottages More images	Q26543285
Crockhurst Street Farmhouse	II	Crockhurst Street			24 August 1990	TQ6240944874; 51°10′48″N 0°19′20″E		1251329	Upload Photo	Q26543301
Somerhill Cottages	II	1-4, Crockhurst Street			24 August 1990	TQ6256144848; 51°10′47″N 0°19′28″E		1251316	Upload Photo	Q26543288
Ploggs Hall Barn, East and West	II	East And West, Maidstone Road, Whetstead			24 August 1990	TQ6564445981; 51°11′21″N 0°22′08″E		1253177	Upload Photo	Q26544963
Barn Approximately 10 Metres East of St Nortons	II	Five Oak Green Road			24 August 1990	TQ6462845337; 51°11′01″N 0°21′15″E		1251319	Upload Photo	Q26543291
Barn Approximately 5 Metres North of Tatlingbury Farmhouse	II	Five Oak Green Road			24 August 1990	TQ6381945037; 51°10′52″N 0°20′33″E		1251322	Upload Photo	Q26543294
Finches Farmhouse	II	Five Oak Green Road, Five Oak Green, TN12 6RP			24 August 1990	TQ6440545455; 51°11′05″N 0°21′04″E		1262826	Upload Photo	Q26553678
George and Dragon Cottage	II	Five Oak Green Road			24 August 1990	TQ6355644945; 51°10′49″N 0°20′19″E		1251321	Upload Photo	Q26543293
Hoppers Hospital	II	Five Oak Green Road	pub		24 August 1990	TQ6473545358; 51°11′01″N 0°21′20″E		1251320	Hoppers Hospital More images	Q26543292
Oak Cottage	II	Five Oak Green Road			24 August 1990	TQ6481745366; 51°11′02″N 0°21′25″E		1262827	Upload Photo	Q26553679
Rose Cottage	II	Five Oak Green Road			24 August 1990	TQ6478245356; 51°11′01″N 0°21′23″E		1251346	Upload Photo	Q26543316
St Nortons Cottages	II	1 and 2, Five Oak Green Road			26 November 1987	TQ6464645344; 51°11′01″N 0°21′16″E		1262837	Upload Photo	Q26553687
Stream Cottage	II	Five Oak Green Road			24 August 1990	TQ6446645226; 51°10′57″N 0°21′06″E		1253173	Upload Photo	Q26544959
The George and Dragon Public House	II	Five Oak Green Road	pub		24 August 1990	TQ6350344904; 51°10′48″N 0°20′16″E		1251348	The George and Dragon Public House More images	Q26543318
White Cottage	II	Five Oak Green Road			24 August 1990	TQ6479645327; 51°11′00″N 0°21′24″E		1253174	Upload Photo	Q26544960
Oasthouse Approximately 5 Metres East of Tatlingbury Farmhouse	II	Five Oaks Green Road			24 August 1990	TQ6386045026; 51°10′52″N 0°20′35″E		1261896	Upload Photo	Q26552813
Dislingbury Farmhouse	II	Half Moon Lane			24 August 1990	TQ6283843789; 51°10′13″N 0°19′40″E		1253175	Upload Photo	Q26544961
Half Moon Cottage	II	Half Moon Lane			5 November 1986	TQ6332844185; 51°10′25″N 0°20′06″E		1261897	Upload Photo	Q26552814
Capel County Primary School, Including Boundary Wall to the South	II	Including Boundary Wall To The South, Five Oak Green Road	architectural structure		24 August 1990	TQ6391945118; 51°10′54″N 0°20′38″E		1262836	Capel County Primary School, Including Boundary Wall to the South More images	Q26553686
Tatlingbury Farmhouse, Including Garden Walls Adjoining to the West	II*	Including Garden Walls Adjoining To The West, Five Oak Green Road			20 October 1954	TQ6382645009; 51°10′51″N 0°20′33″E		1262828	Upload Photo	Q17547618
Garden Walls Approximately 2 Metres East of Stone Castle Farmhouse	II	Maidstone Road, Whetstead			24 August 1990	TQ6586446218; 51°11′28″N 0°22′20″E		1253178	Upload Photo	Q26544964
Oasthouse Approximately 20 Metres North of Stone Castle Farmhouse	II	Maidstone Road, Whetstead			11 January 1990	TQ6580946229; 51°11′28″N 0°22′17″E		1261900	Upload Photo	Q26552817
Ploggs Hall	II	Maidstone Road, Whetstead			24 August 1990	TQ6568945935; 51°11′19″N 0°22′11″E		1261898	Upload Photo	Q26552815
Ploggs Hall Oast	II	1 and 2, Maidstone Road, Whetstead			24 August 1990	TQ6565945955; 51°11′20″N 0°22′09″E		1253176	Upload Photo	Q26544962
Stone Castle Farmhouse	II	Maidstone Road, Whetstead			11 January 1990	TQ6581846204; 51°11′28″N 0°22′18″E		1261899	Upload Photo	Q26552816
Barn Approximately 6 Metres North West of Burgess Hill Farmhouse	II	Pembury Road, Castle Hill			14 October 1987	TQ6097643987; 51°10′21″N 0°18′05″E		1251206	Upload Photo	Q26543190
Castle Hill Farmhouse	II	Pembury Road, Castle Hill	farmhouse		20 October 1954	TQ6105743610; 51°10′09″N 0°18′08″E		1251205	Castle Hill Farmhouse More images	Q26543189
Barn and Adjoining Cartsheds Aqpproximately 25 Metres North of Postern Park Farmhouse	II	Postern Lane, Tudeley	barn		22 February 1990	TQ6146246331; 51°11′36″N 0°18′34″E		1253219	Barn and Adjoining Cartsheds Aqpproximately 25 Metres North of Postern Park Farmhouse More images	Q26544994
Oasthouse Approximately 45 Metres North West of Postern Park Farmhouse	II	Postern Lane, Tudeley	hop kiln		22 February 1990	TQ6142846368; 51°11′37″N 0°18′32″E		1253221	Oasthouse Approximately 45 Metres North West of Postern Park Farmhouse More images	Q26544996
Postern Park Farmhouse	II	Postern Lane, Tudeley	farmhouse		20 October 1954	TQ6144946300; 51°11′35″N 0°18′33″E		1261901	Postern Park Farmhouse More images	Q26552818
Stable at Postern Park Farmhouse	II	Postern Lane, Tudeley			22 February 1990	TQ6150046315; 51°11′36″N 0°18′36″E		1253180	Upload Photo	Q26544965
The Postern	II*	Postern Lane, Tudeley	architectural structure		20 October 1954	TQ6072246206; 51°11′33″N 0°17′55″E		1253179	The Postern More images	Q17547561
Upper Postern Farmhouse	II*	Postern Lane, Tudeley	farmhouse		20 October 1954	TQ6153746065; 51°11′28″N 0°18′37″E		1253225	Upper Postern Farmhouse More images	Q17547568
Upper Postern Oast	II	Postern Lane, Tudeley	house		24 August 1990	TQ6148646050; 51°11′27″N 0°18′34″E		1253181	Upper Postern Oast More images	Q26544966
Bank Farmhouse	II	Sherendon Lane, Tudeley	farmhouse		24 August 1990	TQ6281645366; 51°11′04″N 0°19′42″E		1253182	Bank Farmhouse More images	Q26544967
Lilley Farmhouse	II	Sherendon Lane, Tudeley			24 August 1990	TQ6290445696; 51°11′14″N 0°19′47″E		1253477	Upload Photo	Q26545226
Oasthouse Approximately 10 Metres North of Bank Farmhouse	II	Sherendon Lane, Tudeley	hop kiln		24 August 1990	TQ6282845395; 51°11′05″N 0°19′42″E		1253183	Oasthouse Approximately 10 Metres North of Bank Farmhouse More images	Q26544968
Sherendon Farmhouse	II	Sherendon Lane, Tudeley			20 October 1954	TQ6278546279; 51°11′33″N 0°19′42″E		1253478	Upload Photo	Q26545227
Barn Approximately 40 Metres South of Brook Farmhouse	II	Sychem Lane, Five Oak Green			24 August 1990	TQ6455944826; 51°10′44″N 0°21′11″E		1253480	Upload Photo	Q26545229
Brook Cottage	II	Sychem Lane, Five Oak Green			24 August 1990	TQ6454144718; 51°10′41″N 0°21′09″E		1253481	Upload Photo	Q26545230
Brook Farmhouse	II	Sychem Lane, Five Oak Green			17 July 1990	TQ6461344876; 51°10′46″N 0°21′13″E		1253479	Upload Photo	Q26545228
Farm Office Approximately 1 Metre North of Lydd Farmhouse	II	Sychem Lane, Five Oak Green			9 May 1990	TQ6444844753; 51°10′42″N 0°21′05″E		1253484	Upload Photo	Q26545233
Lydd Farmhouse	II	Sychem Lane, Five Oak Green	farmhouse		25 April 1990	TQ6444244744; 51°10′42″N 0°21′04″E		1253483	Lydd Farmhouse More images	Q26545232
Oasthouse Approximately 12 Metres North West of Lydd Farmhouse	II	Sychem Lane, Five Oak Green	hop kiln		9 May 1990	TQ6443444768; 51°10′43″N 0°21′04″E		1261771	Oasthouse Approximately 12 Metres North West of Lydd Farmhouse More images	Q26552699
The Clock House	II	Sychem Lane, Five Oak Green	house		9 May 1990	TQ6444844769; 51°10′43″N 0°21′05″E		1253482	The Clock House More images	Q26545231
Barn Approximately 6 Metres North of Tudeley Hall	II	Tudeley Hale	barn		24 August 1990	TQ6219146049; 51°11′26″N 0°19′11″E		1253533	Barn Approximately 6 Metres North of Tudeley Hall More images	Q26545279
Carthouse and Granary Approximately 10 Metres North of Hale Farmhouse	II	Tudeley Hale			24 August 1990	TQ6215946074; 51°11′27″N 0°19′09″E		1261772	Upload Photo	Q26552700
Front Wall of the Goldsmid Family Cemetery	II	Tudeley Hale	wall		24 August 1990	TQ6206145611; 51°11′12″N 0°19′03″E		1253485	Front Wall of the Goldsmid Family Cemetery More images	Q26545234
Hale Farm Oast House the Oast Barn	II	Tudeley Hale	barn		24 August 1990	TQ6212946092; 51°11′28″N 0°19′08″E		1253487	Hale Farm Oast House the Oast Barn More images	Q26545236
Hale Farmhouse	II	Tudeley Hale			24 August 1990	TQ6214846049; 51°11′26″N 0°19′08″E		1253486	Upload Photo	Q26545235
Latters Farmhouse	II	Tudeley Hale			24 August 1990	TQ6224446450; 51°11′39″N 0°19′14″E		1253488	Upload Photo	Q26545237
Sandling Farmhouse	II	Tudeley Hale			17 July 1990	TQ6179145848; 51°11′20″N 0°18′50″E		1253522	Upload Photo	Q26545268
Tudeley Hall	II	Tudeley Hale	house		24 August 1990	TQ6218646020; 51°11′25″N 0°19′10″E		1261773	Tudeley Hall More images	Q26552701
Barn Approximately 25 Metres South West of Gate Cottage and Gate House	II	Tudeley Lane	barn		24 August 1990	TQ6175945568; 51°11′11″N 0°18′48″E		1261453	Barn Approximately 25 Metres South West of Gate Cottage and Gate House More images	Q26552401
Barn Approximately 30 Metres North of Nos 1 and 2 Brook Cottages	II	Tudeley Lane			24 August 1990	TQ6035645532; 51°11′11″N 0°17′35″E		1261774	Upload Photo	Q26552702
Brook Farm Cottages	II	1 and 2, Tudeley Lane			24 August 1990	TQ6033145501; 51°11′11″N 0°17′34″E		1253535	Upload Photo	Q26545281
Church Farmhouse Including Bakehouse Approximately 1.5 Metres to the East	II	Tudeley Lane	farmhouse		24 August 1990	TQ6210145387; 51°11′05″N 0°19′05″E		1254120	Church Farmhouse Including Bakehouse Approximately 1.5 Metres to the East More images	Q26545808
Church of All Saints	I	Tudeley Lane	church building		20 October 1954	TQ6215645407; 51°11′06″N 0°19′08″E		1261437	Church of All Saints More images	Q17524671
Dairy About 10 Metres North of Park Farmhouse	II	Tudeley Lane, Somerhill Park			24 August 1990	TQ6158945044; 51°10′54″N 0°18′38″E		1254117	Upload Photo	Q26545805
Gate Cottage Gate House	II	Tudeley Lane	house		24 August 1990	TQ6179245583; 51°11′12″N 0°18′49″E		1254119	Gate Cottage Gate House More images	Q26545807
Group of 5 Headstones About 8 Metres South East of the Porch of the Church of All Saints	II	Tudeley Lane			24 August 1990	TQ6216445393; 51°11′05″N 0°19′08″E		1261454	Upload Photo	Q26552402
Jubilee Fountain	II	Tudeley Lane	fountain		24 August 1990	TQ6204745524; 51°11′10″N 0°19′02″E		1254174	Jubilee Fountain More images	Q26545857
Milking Parlour and Cider House Immediately South of Park Farmhouse	II	Tudeley Lane, Somerhill Park			24 August 1990	TQ6157245007; 51°10′53″N 0°18′37″E		1261451	Upload Photo	Q26552399
Old School Cottages	II	1, 2 and 3, Tudeley Lane	cottage		24 August 1990	TQ6199445548; 51°11′10″N 0°19′00″E		1254167	Old School Cottages More images	Q26545851
Park Farmhouse	II	Tudeley Lane, Somerhill Park			24 August 1990	TQ6157845026; 51°10′54″N 0°18′37″E		1254116	Upload Photo	Q26545804
Somerhill	I	Tudeley Lane, Somerhill Park	school building		20 October 1954	TQ6086745121; 51°10′58″N 0°18′01″E		1253489	Somerhill More images	Q7559754
The Round House	II	Tudeley Lane			24 August 1990	TQ6176045590; 51°11′12″N 0°18′48″E		1254118	Upload Photo	Q26545806
Turkey House About 25 Metres North East of Park Farmhouse	II	Tudeley Lane, Somerhill Park			24 August 1990	TQ6161345025; 51°10′54″N 0°18′39″E		1261452	Upload Photo	Q26552400
Terrace Walls Around the South and East Sides of Somerhill Including the Sunken Lake Approximately 5 Metres North of the Somerhill Stable Yard	II	Tudley Lane, Somerhill Park			24 August 1990	TQ6091845145; 51°10′58″N 0°18′04″E		1254115	Upload Photo	Q26545803
Moat Farmhouse	II	Whetstead Road, Five Oak Green			20 October 1954	TQ6456345909; 51°11′19″N 0°21′13″E		1254197	Upload Photo	Q26545880
Thistles Wenhams Cottages	II*	1, Whetstone Road, Five Oak Green			20 October 1954	TQ6479545550; 51°11′08″N 0°21′24″E		1254121	Upload Photo	Q17547575

== See also ==
- Grade I listed buildings in Kent
- Grade II* listed buildings in Kent

== Sources ==
- Newman, John (2012) [1969], Kent: West and the Weald, The Buildings of England, New Haven and London: Yale University Press, ISBN 978-0-300-18509-6
