= Elizabeth de la Porte =

British musician (1941–2020)

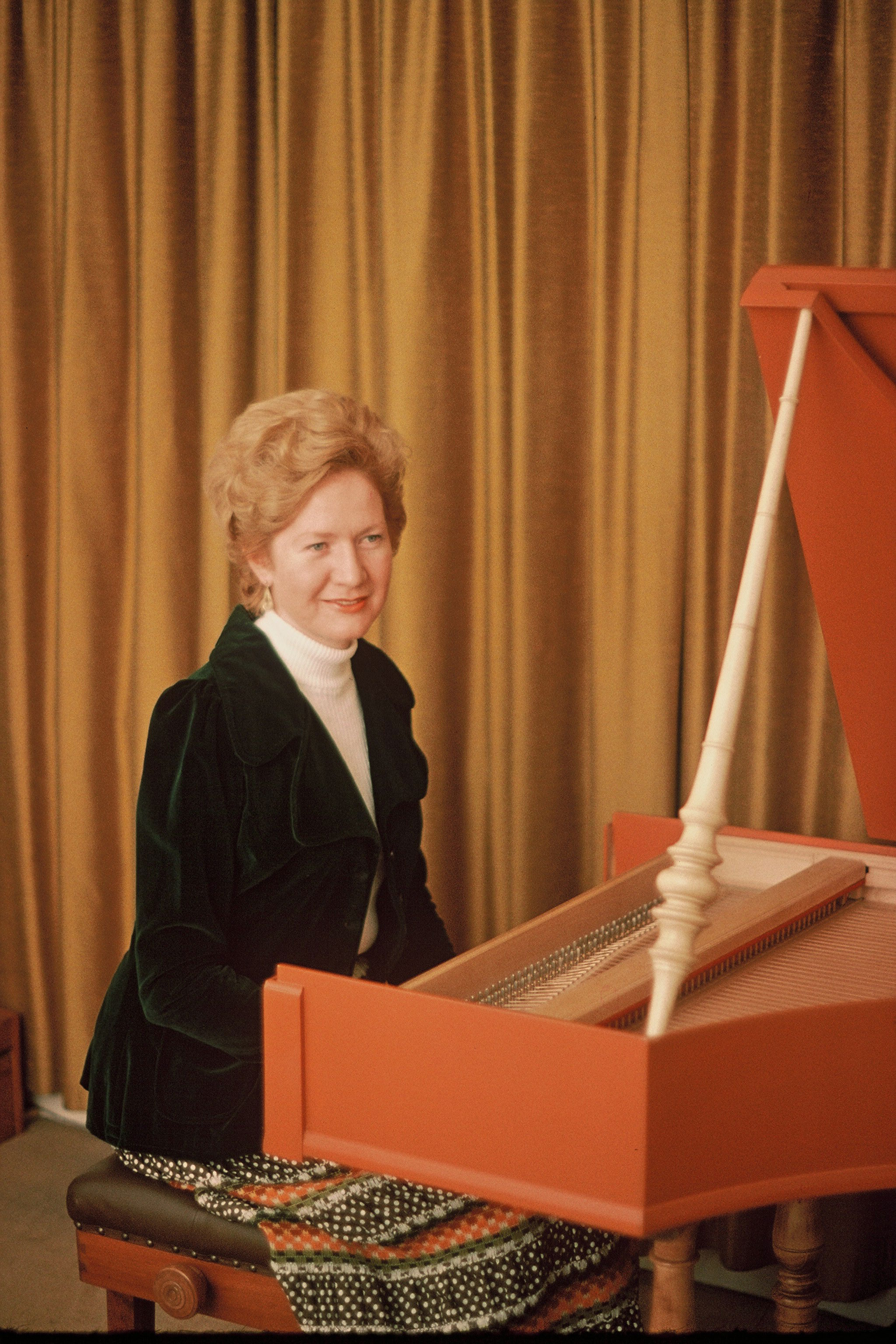
Elizabeth de la Porte at the harpsichord known as the 'Little Italian'

Elizabeth de la Porte FRCM (15 September 1941 – 9 April 2020) was a South African harpsichordist, Baroque tutor and pianist. She was renowned for bringing to her performances a rhythmic drive and excitement while allowing the instrument to sing, with extraordinary seamless and legato lines and expressive phrasing. During her performing career she made many public appearances, in the UK, continental Europe (Vienna, Geneva etc.), and her native South Africa. She was acclaimed for a wide-ranging repertoire that included Böhm, Rameau, François Couperin, Scarlatti and Handel, but she was praised above all for her playing of J. S. Bach and his six Partitas for solo harpsichord. At her debut in March 1972 she was hailed by The Daily Telegraph as "A mind that both contemplates and acts on intimate stylistic knowledge." Her Bach recording for Saga was reviewed in Records & Recording by John Duarte (March 1976) who wrote, "It is in the Partita in B minor that her playing reaches the proportions of grandeur. There is much to admire in de la Porte's playing, but above all its through line and motivation; she plays as a good orator speaks, and it would be a poor student who could not add to a score the long phrasing marks implied by these performances. It is not just that she sees the end of long phrases and sections from their outset; she carries you in one sweep from beginning to end; it's the wholeness of the music that she communicates, and the joy of it."

Elizabeth de la Porte was born at Johannesburg in South Africa on 15 September 1941, the daughter of William James Tomlinson and his wife, the singer Betsy de la Porte. For her schooling she attended Kingsmead College in Johannesburg. For her piano studies she went to Adolph Hallis, and for Bach and for theory to Stefan Zondagh. She was in her mid-teens when she played the Tchaikovsky First Piano Concerto for a South African radio broadcast; however her strongest affinities always lay with J. S. Bach. When she won the University of South Africa's Overseas Scholarship it was for her piano performance of Bach's C minor Partita.

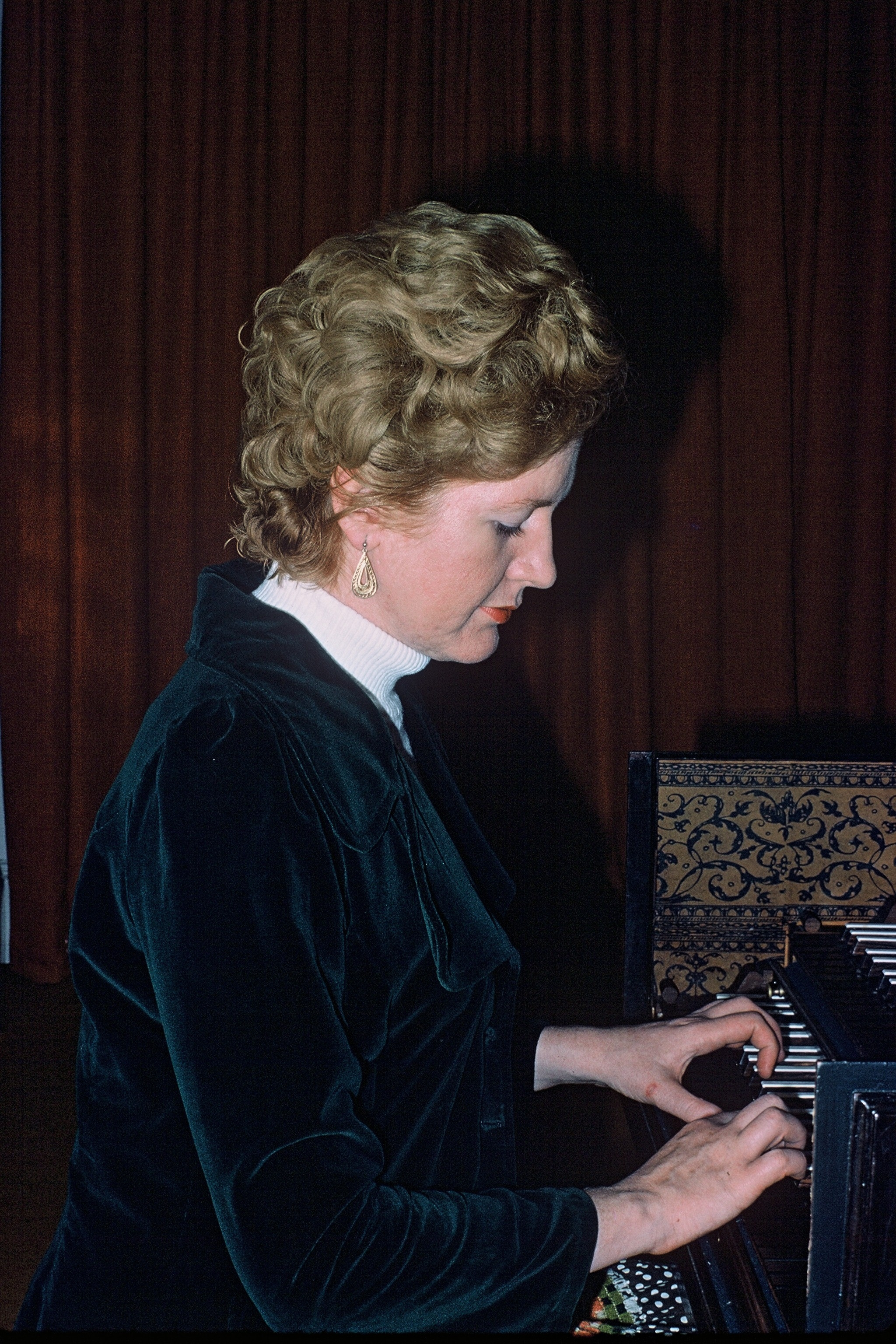

This scholarship led to three years at Vienna (the Vienna Academy) where her principal teachers were Josef Dichler and Hilde Langer-Rühl. In Vienna she became properly acquainted with the harpsichord and the influence of Nikolaus Harnoncourt who was currently establishing the Concentus Musicus Wien. She went on to the Royal College of Music London where her teachers included Kendall Taylor (piano) and Thornton Lofthouse (harpsichord). She now resolved to concentrate on the harpsichord, and she extended her studies further with Jane Clark and Rafael Puyana.

She made her harpsichord debut at the Purcell Room in London (February 1972), going on to perform all Bach's French Suites at a special series at St. John's Smith Square in London, and managing something remarkable for the 1970s with an all Couperin recital that sold out the Purcell Room. She made several appearances on BBC Television, and her first record (Vinyl-disc) was the "Elizabeth de la Porte Collection" for Ted Perry, then at Saga Records. He and Saga also issued her famous record of Bach's Italian Concerto and French Overture (B minor Partita), together with the Chromatic Fantasia and Fugue. Her set of the six Partitas were subsequently put out by Ted Perry after he had gone on to found Hyperion. Stanley Sadie, Editor in Chief of the New Grove, described this in Gramophone (April 1983) as "A very fine recording of the harpsichord partitas by Elizabeth de la Porte, which shows the breadth of range of these supreme examples of the Baroque harpsichord suite." All these Bach recordings of works by Johann Sebastian Bach have recently been re-released by London Independent Records, now London Independent Classics, director Jan Hart. Prof Piet de Villiers helped her a few times during her career to achieve bigger heights.

Health difficulties resulted in her early retirement from public performance, but in July 2003 she made a rare return, joining her son and his Baroque Group Extraordinaire for Bach's C major Two-Harpsichord Concerto at St Sepulchre's Church in the City of London. She continued taking great pleasure in her teaching. She taught at the London Royal College of Music Junior Department for 55 years (its longest-serving member of staff to date), which she found particularly rewarding and where she cofounded Baroque ensemble tutored groups in addition to individual teaching. Latterly she also taught at St Edmund's, Kent College and the Junior King's School, both at Canterbury near her home in Faversham in East Kent.

In 2016, she was made a Fellow of the Royal College of Music in recognition of her services to music and music education.

She married Dr Paul Dawson-Bowling in 1966, and they had three children.

She died on 9 April 2020.
