= Adolph Hallis =

South African pianist, composer and teacher

Adolph Hallis (4 July 1896 – 1987) was a South African pianist, composer and teacher.

== Life ==
Hallis was born in Port Elizabeth, Cape Colony and travelled to England in his twenties, where he studied at the Royal Academy of Music; his teachers there included Tobias Matthay and Oscar Beringer. He made his debut at the Wigmore Hall in 1919, and after a wide-ranging European career settled back in South Africa in 1939, where he became a teacher at the University of the Witwatersrand. He died in South Africa in 1987.

== Career ==
During his career Hallis premiered numerous works, including piano concertos by Alan Rawsthorne and Erik Chisholm. He gave the first British performance of Dmitri Shostakovich's First Piano Concerto in Birmingham in 1936. Although Arnold Cooke's Piano Concerto (1939/'40) was written for Hallis, the outbreak of WWII prevented him giving its première, which was given instead by Louis Kentner with the BBC Symphony Orchestra under Clarence Raybould in 1943 in a studio broadcast for the BBC's Third Programme. In 1938 he made, for Decca Records, the first complete recording of the piano Préludes of Claude Debussy. With Sophie Wyss, Alan Rawsthorne, Christian Darnton and Benjamin Britten he formed the Hallis Concert Society, which gave a number of innovative concerts in London in the period 1936–1939. These included British premieres of both contemporary and historical British and European music, including works of Giovanni Pierluigi da Palestrina, François Couperin, Arnold Cooke, Alban Berg, Paul Hindemith, Elisabeth Lutyens and Elizabeth Maconchy.

Amongst Hallis's compositions were film music, (sometimes under the pseudonym of "Hal Dolphe"), including music for two films of Alfred Hitchcock, Rich and Strange (1931) and Number Seventeen (1932). His other works include a piano concerto and various piano pieces.

His students included many South African keyboard players of the postwar generations, amongst them Michael Blake, Norman Olsfanger winner of first SABC piano competition SAMRO Prize, Marcelle Mierowsky, Neville Dove, Marian Friedman, Paul Hepker, Petronel Malan, Anton Nel, Elizabeth de la Porte, Renee Reznek, and Jeanne Zaidel-Rudolph.
