= Lauren Mellor =

South African model

- Born: 29 December 1985 (age 40); Johannesburg, South Africa
- Modeling information
- Height: 5 ft 9 in (1.75 m)
- Hair color: Brown
- Eye color: Blue
- Agency: Union Models, Outlaws Management, PMA Models, Fashion Models, Metropolitan Models, Wilhelmina Models, Unique Models
- Website: http://lauren-mellor.com/

Lauren Mellor (born 29 December 1985) is a South African fashion model best known for appearing in the South African and American Sports Illustrated Swimsuit Editions.

== Career ==
Mellor first signed with Star Model Management in Johannesburg, Storm Model Management in London, England, Outlaws Models in Cape Town, South Africa, and Modelwerk in Hamburg, Germany. Her first known work was the cover of Top Billing Magazine in April 2005. In 2007, Mellor landed a John Lewis campaign which caught the attention of several media outlets when the brand proclaimed they would only use healthy sized models. That same year, she appeared on the cover of FHM in South Africa and Essentials Magazine. Despite the initial success, Mellor focused on her studies and graduated from the University of Cape Town with a degree in psychology. After graduation, Mellor moved to Germany and signed to Union Models, PMA Models in Hamburg, and AMT Models in Vienna.

In 2008, Mellor landed two international campaigns for Freya Swimwear and Agent Provocateur. In 2009, she appeared in a campaigns for Renault Grand Scenic and Storm in a D Cup as well as the cover of Healthy Magazine. In 2010, Mellor appeared on the October cover of Mother & baby, Stuff Magazine UK in August, and You & Your Wedding. She also shot the Spring/Summer 2010 Expresso campaign in South Africa. Prior to 2011, her major clients included Samsung, Freya, Daniel Hechter Paris for Truworths, Agent Provocateur, Mr. Price, Soviet Jeans, Royal Secret Fragrance, She Magazine, Essentials Magazine, Marie Claire, Cosmopolitan, Top Billing Magazine, FHM Magazine, Mother & Baby, You & Your Wedding, and Healthy Magazine.

After living in Germany, Mellor moved to London where she quickly became a regular on the British e-commerce circuit appearing on clothing websites such as Debenhams, Figleaves.com, Next.co.uk, Littlewoods, Very.co.uk, and Marks & Spencer. In 2011, she posed for the covers Essentials Magazine, Stuff Magazine twice, Mother & Baby Magazine, and Für Sie Magazine as well as appeared in editorials for Top Billing Magazine, She Magazine, Woman Magazine and Lingerie Buyer. Mellor also landed campaigns with La Senza lingerie, The Body Shop, Gin & Tonic, and Rage.

In 2012, Mellor continued working for online retailers such as Debenhams, Figleaves.com, and Marks & Spencers. She also did catalog work for JD Williams of London and K&Co. By March 2012, she signed with Joy Models in Milan. By May 2012, Mellor began doing more editorial and fashion work that was not lingerie inspired including several editorials for Woman Magazine, More Magazine, and Grazia Magazine UK. In July 2012, she signed with Metropolitan Models in Paris. Mellor also started landing more fashion orientated campaigns including the Fall/Winter 2012 Dranella Lookbook, the Spring/Summer 2013 Yumi Lookbook, and the Spring/Summer 2013 Peppercorn Lookbook. In November 2012, Mellor appeared in the South African Sports Illustrated Swimsuit edition. Following that success, she quickly signed with Wilhelmina Models in Los Angeles. Her first job in the United States was catalog work for Wacoal USA. That same year, Mellor landed a campaign for Rosafia by Anita and switched to Fashion Model Management in Milan and Unique Models in Copenhagen.

In January 2013, Mellor signed with Francina Models in Barcelona as well as Wilhelmina Models in New York and Miami. In Spring of 2013, Mellor moved to New York to pursue her modeling career in the United States. During which time, she went on a casting for Sports Illustrated. In 2013, she landed campaigns with the Dranella, Peppercorn, Undone Lingerie, Hunters, Triumph, Bloomingdales, BareNecessities, Littlewoods, Oriflame, Avon, Schwarzkopf, Halens, The Body Shop, Azure, and Freya Lingerie. She also appeared on her first American magazine cover for Long Island Pulse Magazine in July. In December 2013, it was announced that Mellor would appear in the January 2014 edition of Stuff Magazine France. On 7 February 2014, Sports Illustrated announced that Lauren Mellor, although an alum, would be featured as rookie in the magazine.
