= Jean Lowrie-Chin =

- Born: Jean Gopaulsingh; December 5, 1951 (age 74); Kingston, Colony of Jamaica, British Empire
- Occupation: Entrepreneur
- Known for: Procomm

Jean Lowrie-Chin (née Gopaulsingh; born December 5, 1951) is communications consultant, seniors advocate, author and newspaper columnist in Kingston, Jamaica. She is the founder and managing director of PROComm (PRO Communications Limited) and also the founder-CEO of CCRP (Caribbean Community of Retired Persons).

== Education and career ==
Lowrie-Chin was born in 1951 to her parents Maisie and Sidney Gopaulsingh in Westmoreland, Jamaica. Her widowed mother later married noted Accountant Joscelyn E. Lowrie, who adopted her four children and was an exemplary father. The family moved to the capital city Kingston, where she attended Alpha Preparatory School, the Convent of Mercy Academy 'Alpha' for Girls, and then the University of West Indies from 1970–73, graduating with a BA (Hons) in Literature. She returned to UWI to complete an MA in literature in 1987.

She worked at the now defunct Jamaica Daily News as a journalist before teaching at Calabar High School. She left to become a PR Officer at Carifesta 76 (a Caribbean festival,) before she joined Dunlop Corbin Compton Advt as a PR Manager.

She launched her own company in December 1978 - PRO Communications Ltd. In 1988, her husband, engineer Hubert Chin joined the company bringing his expertise in Information Technology which resulted in great success for the company. PROComm Ltd was instrumental in building several brands in Jamaica, and developing affirmation programmes for teachers, nurses, police officers and household workers. The firm has provided public relations, advertising and marketing services to several local and international corporations and organisations. These include Digicel, Food for the Poor, the Norwegian Seafood Export Council, Wray & Nephew Ltd, Pepsi, Sandals Group, and the Electoral Office of Jamaica and the Electoral Commission of Jamaica.

Mrs Lowrie-Chin founded an organization for retired persons in Jamaica, the Caribbean Community of Retired Persons (CCRP) April 2010 which aims at the empowerment of Caribbean seniors. PROComm is currently the major sponsor of this organisation.

In 2013, Mrs Lowrie-Chin and her husband created a real estate development company, PRODEV (PRO-COMM Developments Ltd), and have embarked on commercial and residential projects in the New Kingston area.

== Publications ==
As a writer she has been a columnist for the Jamaica Observer newspaper since 2001, a contributing writer to Jamaicans.com since 2004, and published a book entitled Souldance in 2008. Chapters of her Master's Thesis on Claude McKay were published in Caribbean Quarterly, published by University of the West Indies to honour the author's centenary, and edited by Professor Rex Nettleford. She also wrote a chapter on Carifesta 76 - the Caribbean Festival of Arts - for 'A History of Theatre in Jamaica' by Wycliffe Bennett and Dr Hazel Bennett. She wrote the foreword for 'You Did it Unto Me - The History of Alpha' by Sister Mary Bernadette Little RSM. She also authors a blog at www.lowrie-chin.blogspot.com

== Notable achievements ==
She is a director of the following firms: PRO Communications Ltd, PRODEV Limited, CIBC FirstCaribbean International Bank Jamaica, Food for the Poor Jamaica. She is Founder, CEO and Board Director of the Caribbean Community of Retired Persons Ltd. She is also a member of the Medical Council of Jamaica, the Friends of Devon House and a Trustee of the Grants Pen Foundation Trust, the Madame Rose Leon Memorial Trust for the Women's Political Caucus and the St George's College Endowment Fund.

In 1984 she created Flair magazine for the Jamaica Gleaner and edited the publication for over three years.

Lowrie-Chin is a Justice of the Peace for the Parish of St. Andrew and was appointed Chair of the Digicel Jamaica Foundation in 2014.

She has received several awards including:

The Women's Media Watch Trailblazer Award; The Jamaica 50 Award - presented to 50 women deemed as nationbuilders by the Jamaica Women's Bureau; The Alpha Academy Alumnae Woman of Excellence Award; The Kiwanis Club of New Kingston Distinguished Woman Award; The Marion Ballysingh Award for Outstanding Volunteerism.
