= Rampersad =

Family name

Rampersad, also spelt Ramprasad or Rampersaud, is a surname common in Trinidad and Tobago, Guyana, Suriname, the Caribbean, Fiji, South Africa, and Mauritius. The name is common among Caribbean Hindus, but also among others as a result of ethnic mixing. It is also common among many Christians as well. Many people of this surname have migrated to the United States and Canada as well. Sundar Popo wrote a song called Rampersad.

The name derives from the Indian name Ramprasad, which is a common name among Bhojpuri (a Hindi dialect) speaking areas of the states of Bihar and Uttar Pradesh of northern and eastern India. Prasad in Sanskrit means refers to an offering of food given to the idol (murti) of a god. Although the word is pronounced in Sanskrit as Prasad, the pronunciation changes in Bhojpuri to Parsad or Persad. This is reflected in the Caribbean name as, from 1834 to 1917, indentured plantation workers from chiefly Bhojpur were dispersed far and wide across the world including the Caribbean, Suriname, Fiji and Mauritius. In India it is used as a first name, but the descendants of the indentured laborers in the European colonies used their fathers' first name as their surname.

== People with this given name ==
- Rampersad Parasram, Trinidadian Hindu religious leader, politician and doctor

== People with this surname ==
- Andre Rampersad, Trinidadian footballer
- Arnold Rampersad, Trinidadian-American academic, biographer and literary critic
- Capil Rampersad, Trinidadian cricketer
- Denis Rampersad, Trinidadian cricketer
- Kris Rampersad, Trinidadian journalist, academic and activist

== See also ==
- Rampersaud
