= Jamie Gunns =

British fashion model (born 1985)

Jamie Gunns Cipriani
- Born: Jamie Elizabeth Gunns; November 30, 1985 (age 40); Rivers State, Port Harcourt
- Occupation: Fashion model
- Spouse: Ignazio Cipriani
- Modelling information
- Height: 1.8 m (5 ft 11 in)
- Hair colour: Brown
- Eye colour: Brown
- Agency: Premier Model Management, London (mother agency); Muse Model Management, New York City; Ford Models, Los Angeles; Wilhelmina Models, Miami; Heffner Model Management, Seattle; Munich Models, Munich; Woman Model Management, Milan; Modelwerk Models, Hamburg; Karin Models, Paris; L'Equipe, Lisbon

Jamie Gunns Cipriani (born Jamie Elizabeth Gunns; 30 November 1985) is a British fashion model.

== Early years ==
Gunns was born in Lambeth, London, England. She is of Anglo-Indian (Indo-Jamaican and English) descent. As a child, Gunns struggled with her weight, weighing 11 stone when she was ten. After contracting a stomach virus, she lost a lot of her weight. At the age of 14, while on holiday in Spain, she was scouted by a model agent . Gunns obtained two A-Levels in Art and English at Holy Trinity School.

== Career ==
Within the first eight months of her contract with Premier Model Management, Gunns worked for Chanel, Cosmo Girl, Levis, and Tammy and was featured on billboards throughout the UK. She subsequently took part in Elite Model Management's Elite Model Look competition.

During her career as a model, she has been in campaigns for brands such as Diesel, Just Cavalli, Lee Jeans, Levi's, and Mariella Burani.

She has been on the cover of Evening Standard, The Sunday Times, Zoot Magazine, Maxim, 2oa, and Fantastic Mag. She has appeared in editorials for magazines such as You, Glamour, Anglomania, Arena, and Vogue. In 2009, Gunns appeared on the cover of US Maxim's Swimsuit Issue.

In 2004, she walked for Marks & Spencer, Boudicca, Dirk Bikkembergs, Lela Rose, Michiko Koshino, Nanette Lepore, Frost and French and Red or Dead. In 2005, she walked for Jasper Conrad Spring/Summer 05 Collection in London. In 2006, Gunns took part of Myla's Autumn/ Winter Collection called Myla Debutantes. In 2007, she walked in the Teen Voice Fashion Show in London and The Rock and Republic S/S 2007 fashion show in NY.

In 2011, Gunns appeared on Channel Four's fly-on-the-wall documentary The Model Agency. During the documentary, Gunns talked about her transition from being an editorial model to a commercial model. She claimed catalog work might be "cheesy" but was very profitable.

In 2012, Gunns appeared in numerous catalogs including ASOS, Lipsy, Nelly, Bon Prix, Littlewoods, Nordstrom, Nasty Gal, Saks 5th Avenue. She also did campaigns for Nasty Gal and Motel Rocks.

== Agencies ==
Gunns' mother agency is Premier Model Management in London. After competing in the Elite Models Look competition, she signed to Elite Models in New York, Barcelona, and Munich. In 2007, Gunns left Elite Model Management in New York for IMG Models. A year later, she left IMG for Muse Model Management. By 2010, Gunns signed to Ford Models in New York. Her agencies in 2011 included Munich Models in Munich, ANC Models in Hamburg, Ulla Models in Amsterdam, The Agency Artist Management in Bern, MC2 Model Management in Tel Aviv, and Premier Model Management in London. That same year, ANC Models closed its doors and Gunns was placed with Modelwerk. In 2012, Gunns left several agencies but was placed with Heffner Models in Seattle and Wilhelmina Models in Miami. By January 2013, Gunns re-signed with Muse Models in New York and Women Models in Milan. Additionally, she signed with L'Equipe Models in Lisbon.

She is currently signed to Premier Model Management in London, Muse Models in New York, Wilhelmina Models in Miami, Ford Models in Los Angeles, Heffner Models in Seattle, Karin Models in Paris, Modelwerk in Hamburg, Munich Models in Munich, L'Equipe Models in Lisbon, and Women Models in Milan.

== Personal life ==
On 30 March 2013, Gunns married Ignazio Cipriani in a simple civil ceremony which was broadcast on Italian television.
