= Alina Văcariu =

Romanian actress and model (born 1980)

- Born: December 14, 1984 (age 41); Romania
- Modeling information
- Height: 1.76 m (5 ft 9 in)
- Hair color: Brown
- Eye color: Brown

Alina Văcariu (Romanian pronunciation: [aˈlina vəkaˈri.u]; born December 14, 1984, in Suceava) is a Romanian actress and model. Among other work, she was Romania's Model of the Year in 1998 (at age of 14), which later resulted in her signing a contract with Elite Model Management. She has modeled bikinis and lingerie for the Finish Line, Inc.

She starred in the Time Warner Cable commercial "Roommate Wanted", and appeared in a cameo role for the 2005 indie film Death of a Dynasty. She also posed for September edition of Stuff in 2001 and the May 2003 edition of Maxim.

She did many commercials for Abercrombie & Fitch, Bare Necessities, Bebe, Bianchi, Clairol, Dupont, Frederick's Of Hollywood, JC Penney, Jessica McClintock, Jim Hjelm Couture, John Frieda, Lilyette, L'Oréal, Maidenform, Marisa, Parasuco, Stella Artois and appeared on magazines covers such as Cosmopolitan Mexico (Summer 2006) and Playboy Spain (January 2010).

Since 2008, Văcariu has been represented by Irene Marie Models and Munich Models.
