= Raj Rampersaud =

Yoga Raja "Raj" Rampersaud is a Canadian orthopedic surgeon at Toronto Western Hospital. He is known for his advocacy of interprofessional models of health care. He is a professor at the University of Toronto.

== Early life and education ==
Rampersaud was born in British Guiana; his father was a dentist. He immigrated to Canada with his family as a young boy and lived in Hamilton, Ontario. His parents, working in Canada as a janitor and a seamstress, encouraged him to attend medical school. He studied orthopedic surgery at the University of Western Ontario, graduating in 1992.

== Career ==
Rampersaud joined Toronto Western Hospital, specializing in spine surgery, and later lead a surgical team conducting minimally invasive of "keyhole" surgery.

In the 2000s, Rampersaud began speaking out about a problem in the health care system: many of the people with back pain who were referred to him by their family doctors were not candidates for spinal surgery. The result was wasted time for both the surgeon and the patient, and wasted money for the taxpayers. In 2010, Rampersaud took part in a pilot project at TWH which determined that a specially trained nurse practitioner could assess patients with back pain as accurately as the surgeons at the hospital.

In 2011 Rampersaud developed a proposal which he sent to the Ontario government describing a process of pre-screening which would separate out those in need of surgery from those who could best be helped by other therapy. The proposal pointed out that pre-screening could save money by cutting down on the number of unnecessary visits to specialists and MRI tests, as well as helping patients receive appropriate care sooner.

In 2013, Rampersaud began organizing a project to set up a series of Inter-Professional Spine And Assessment Clinics, staffed with diagnostic experts and therapists. The clinics have been able to reduce wait times, unnecessary diagnostic tests, and referrals to specialists, while providing patients with more targeted and effective treatment.
