= Five Oak Green =

Village in Kent, England

Coordinates: 51.183930°N 0.358180°E

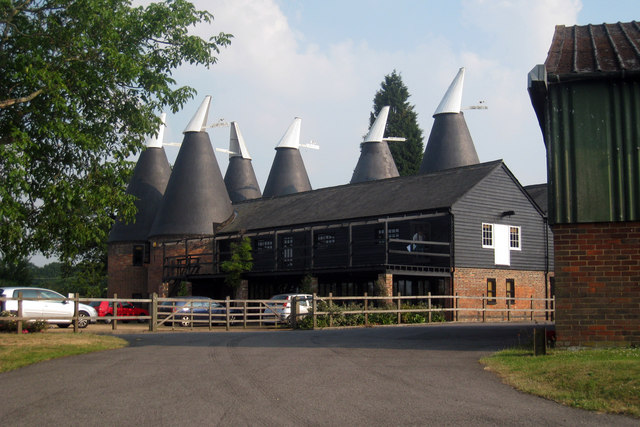
- Tatlingbury Oast on Five Oak Green Road

- Location within Kent
- Civil parish: Capel
- District: Tunbridge Wells
- Shire county: Kent
- Region: South East
- Country: England
- Sovereign state: United Kingdom
- Post town: Tonbridge
- Postcode district: TN12
- Dialling code: 01892
- Police: Kent
- Fire: Kent
- Ambulance: South East Coast
- UK Parliament: Tunbridge Wells

Five Oak Green is a village near Tonbridge, Kent in the Civil Parish of Capel.

The village was a centre for hop growing. In the 19th century, The Rose and Crown public house was converted to a hospital to treat the many hop pickers who resided in the village and its surroundings in the late summer. The public house was renamed "The Little Hoppers' Hospital" by a London priest, Richard Wilson, who added to the house's sign "No beer sold here", so no one should have any doubt of its changed role.

The village oast house, the Moat Farm Oast, has been converted and now houses a number of businesses.
