= India–Jamaica relations =

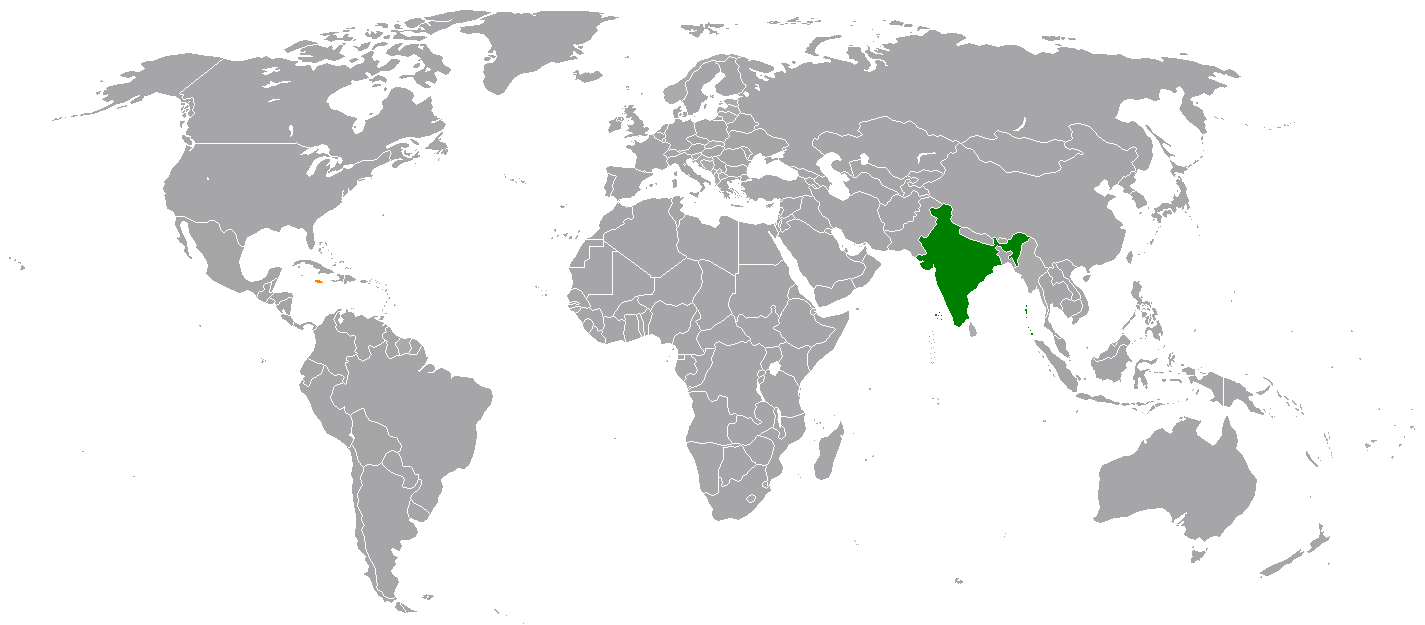

- India: Jamaica

India–Jamaica relations are the bilateral diplomatic relations between India and Jamaica. The two countries have traditionally maintained friendly and cordial relations, underpinned by cultural and political linkages inherited from the era of the British Empire, including their membership in the Commonwealth of Nations, parliamentary democratic systems, the use of the English language, and a shared interest in sports such as cricket.

Both nations are members of the Non-Aligned Movement, and Jamaica supports India's candidacy for permanent membership on a reformed UN Security Council.

== History ==
Relations between India and Jamaica can be traced back to the period of British colonial rule in the 19th century. During this time, indentured laborers from India migrated to various parts of the Caribbean, indirectly influencing the development of Jamaican society. Although the scale of Indian migration to Jamaica was smaller than that to Trinidad and Tobago or Guyana, it nevertheless laid the foundation for subsequent people-to-people and cultural connections between India and Jamaica.

Following Jamaica's independence in 1962, the two countries gradually developed diplomatic relations as fellow members of the Commonwealth of Nations. From the latter half of the 20th century onward, they strengthened cooperation in multilateral forums, particularly through the Non-Aligned Movement and broader collaboration among developing countries.

In the 21st century, bilateral engagement has expanded in areas such as trade, development cooperation, education, and technology, alongside India's economic growth. High-level diplomatic visits and the conclusion of bilateral agreements have further consolidated relations between the two countries.

== Diplomatic missions ==
India has a High Commission in Kingston, whilst Jamaica has a High Commission in New Delhi.

== Trade ==
Bilateral trade has been increasing at a healthy rate, from US$ 28.28 million in 2011-12 to over US$ 64 million in 2019-20. In 2021, the total bilateral trade was US$ 66.29 million with India's exports worth US$ 64.06 million, and India's imports from Jamaica were valued at US$ 2.23 million.

== Indians in Jamaica ==
People of Indian origin or descent number over 3% of the population of Jamaica. This includes the descendants of indentured labourers brought between 1845 and 1917 and subsequent arrivals of professionals.
