= Hanro =

Austro-Swiss intimate apparel company

Brand logo

Hanro International GmbH, with headquarters in Götzis in Austria, produces lingerie, nightwear, and loungewear for men and women. The company's products can be found in almost 50 countries and are sold at specialty retailers, department stores, and its own 14 boutiques and outlet stores. The company was founded in 1884 in Liestal, Switzerland, by Albert Handschin. The Huber Group acquired the company in 1991.

== History ==
=== 1884 to 1945 ===
In 1884, Albert Handschin founded a hand-knitting company in Liestal. Carl Ronus joined the company in 1895. The two entrepreneurs established a general partnership under the legal name Handschin & Ronus. The company had 60 employees at that time. In 1898, the company acquired the Benzbur property in Liestal. The production buildings there were ready for use a year later. In 1911, growing demand allowed the opening of a second production facility in Büren, Solothurn. The brand Hanro, a portmanteau of the surnames of the founders, was registered as a trademark in 1913. Before World War I, the company produced and exported lingerie for women. The most important sales markets in the prewar years were in France, the British Empire, and the United States.

During World War I, the company adjusted its product assortment and began to produce military underwear. At the end of 1919, the owners converted the general partnership into a family-owned public limited company: Hanro AG. A subsidiary was established in Australia in 1926. As a result, 17 employees settled in Bendigo and began production with the machines that they had brought with them from Switzerland. From the mid-1930s, the company expanded into beach and swimwear. Technological innovations (circular knitting machines) also allowed the company to move into outerwear.

During World War II production and sales were difficult because materials were scarce, textiles were rationed, and fabrics were substituted.

=== 1945 to 1991 ===
Once the war was over, production was picked up again. This resulted in the recruitment of young women from Italy in 1947. In the years that followed, the employment of these Italian women was considered a positive example in the history of Swiss labor migration. From 1946 to 1958 production volume grew and the number of employees doubled to a total of 689. In the 1950s, Hanro sold its products in 45 countries.

Hanro took over the textile company HIS & Co. KG in Murgenthal in 1963, resulting in the company Hanro Hisco AG. Hanro sold its Australian subsidiary in the mid-1960s. In 1970, Hanro Nova SA in Novazzano was founded as a subsidiary, right on the Italian border. In 1972, the number of employees stood at 1,000. A minority share in Hanro AG was acquired in 1973 by Traversina S. A., an investment company affiliated with Dubied & Cie. S. A.; however, more than four-fifths of the capital stock remained with the heirs of the founding families of Handschin and Ronus. Hanro Hisco AG was closed three years later. The 1970s proved to be a challenging decade for the company as a whole – like many production companies in Switzerland, Hanro suffered under the strong franc and relatively high wages, as well as from the duties that made export business more difficult. In 1980, Hanro established a subsidiary near Dublin. In the 1980s, the company increasingly focused on the manufacture of daywear and sleepwear.

=== Since 1991 ===
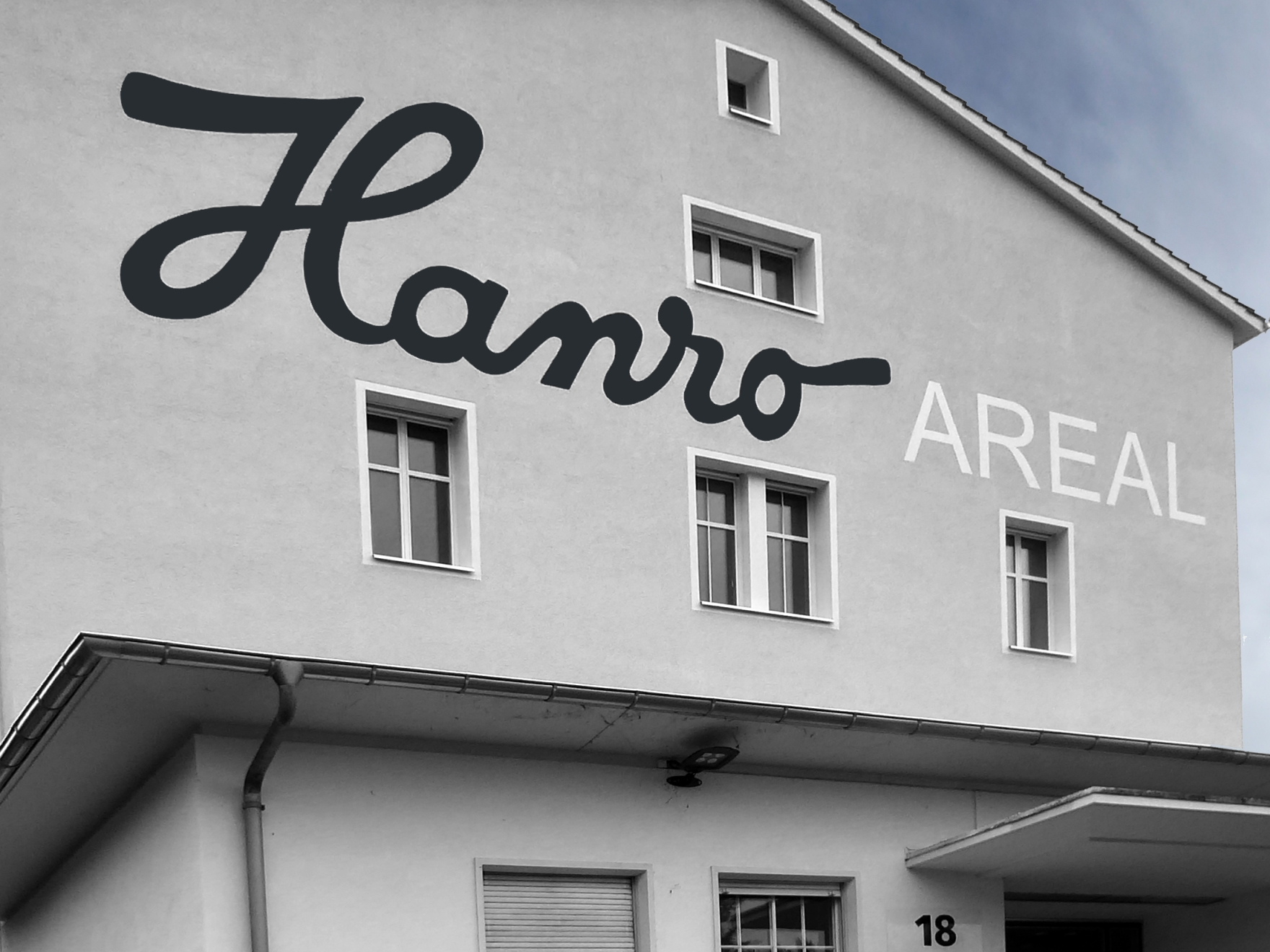
The repurposed Hanro building in Liestal is now the location of the Hanro Collection of Archäologie und Museum Baselland

In 1991, Huber Tricot acquired a 75% share in the company, which until then had been managed as a family-run enterprise for three generations. At this time, the company had around 500 employees in Liestal, Novazzano, and Dublin. Two years later, the remaining 25% was taken over. From 1997 to 1999, production in Liestal was gradually discontinued in favor of the parent company. The Dublin production facility was sold in 1998. Production in Novazzano ended in 2002. Since 2004, the Hanro headquarters have been in Götzis (Vorarlberg), Austria, where the Huber Group is based.

In the years since 2010, Hanro has once again been able to achieve the same export ratio the company once did when it was first founded. While over 50% of all products made were sold outside of Switzerland in 1973, revenue from goods sold outside Austria was around 95% in 2012.

The Canton of Baselland received the textile company's collection in 2015. The collection comprises the company's historical textiles and the operations archive. With this acquisition, the Hanro Collection became part of the cantonal collections of the Archäologie und Museum Baselland.

A selection of the textiles and historical documents is available for online research on the Kulturgüterportal Baselland.

According to company information, the countries with the highest revenues in 2020 are the United States, followed by Germany, Switzerland, the British Isles, Austria, Italy, France, the Netherlands, and Japan. As of 2015, the company's products are distributed in approximately 50 countries.

== Present day company and brand ==
=== Integration and Hanro locations ===
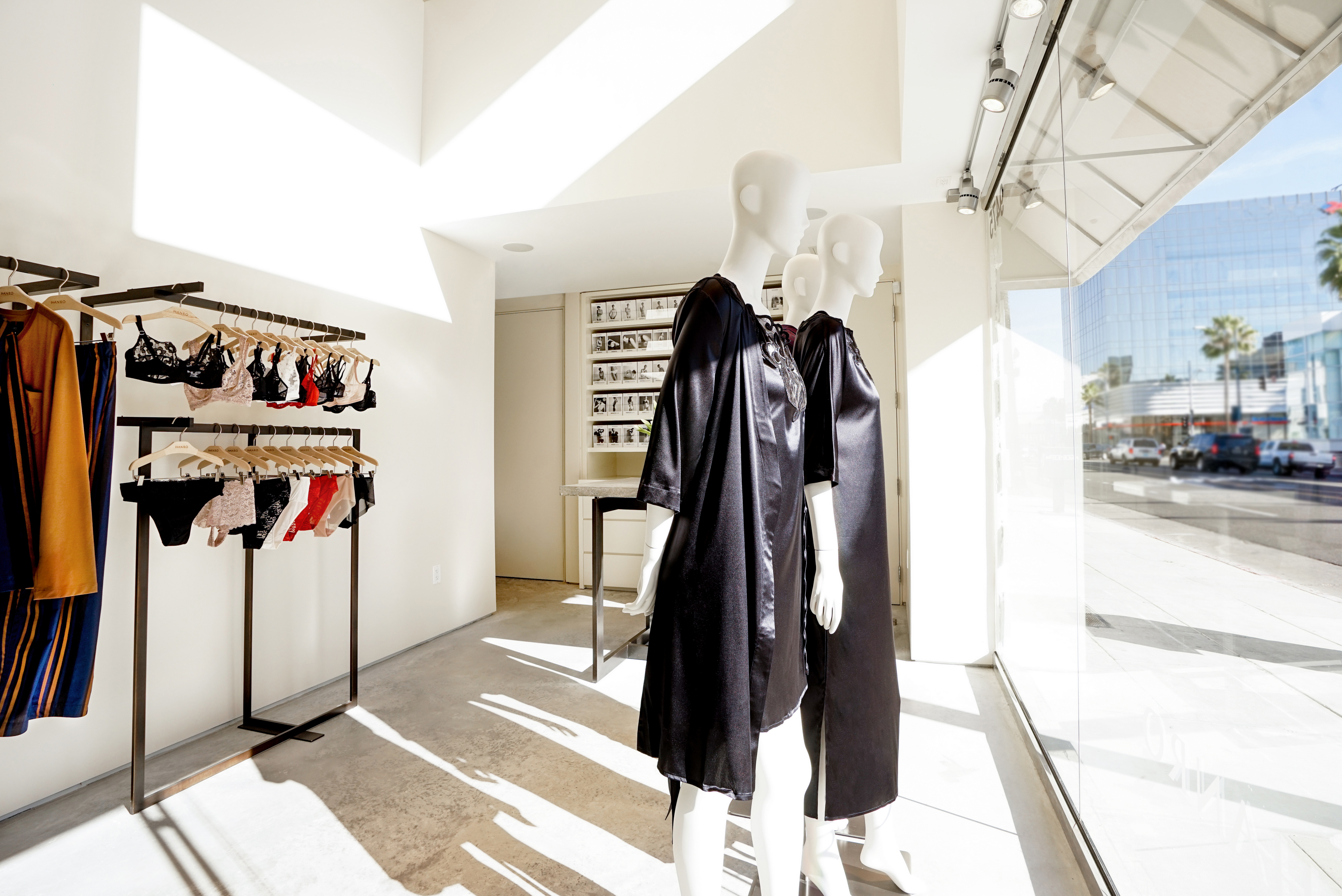
Hanro Store in Beverly Hills (2017)

Hanro International GmbH is part of the Huber Group and has five subsidiaries in Switzerland, Germany, France, Italy, and the United States. Hanro Stores can be found in 12 cities around the world. There are also two outlets in Switzerland.

=== Product segments, production, and markets ===
Hanro is a producer of lingerie, sleepwear, and loungewear. The products are considered high-quality. 80% of the textiles are manufactured in the Arula production plant (Mäder, Vorarlberg), which belongs to Huber Holding; sewing takes place in Portugal, and the warehouse is in Hungary. Products are sold in almost 50 countries.

=== Brand profile and affiliated brands ===
In terms of their design, materials, finishing, and price point, Hanro's products are oriented towards the luxury market.

The affiliated brands in the Huber Group are Skiny, Huber, and HOM.

== Films and awards ==
=== Films ===
Hanro has played a role in certain movie scenes and literary works. In The Seven Year Itch (1955) Marilyn Monroe wore Hanro briefs in the iconic scene where she stands over the subway grate. Nicole Kidman was shown in a white Hanro camisole top in Eyes Wide Shut (1999). Dakota Johnson wore a pair of the brand's white cotton briefs in Fifty Shades of Grey (2015). Hanro is mentioned in Cecily von Ziegesar's Gossip Girl series of novels.

=== Awards ===
At the Exposition Universelle in Paris, five years after the founding of the company, Handschin was awarded a silver medal by the French Ministère du Commerce de l’Industrie et des Colonies.

In 1994, in London, Hanro won a packaging competition for the products in the Streck Feeling line.

Hanro was named Designer of the Year in 2016 at the Salon International de la Lingerie specialist trade fair.

== Annex ==
=== Literature ===
- Ulrike Langbein: Allerweltszeug. Kulturanthropologische Perspektiven auf Kleidung, modellierte Menschen und die Sammlung der Hanro AG (1884-2012). In: Schweizerisches Archiv für Volkskunde, Volume 112 (2016), Booklet 1, p. 6–23 (digital version).
- Lothar Peters, Ursula Kyburz, Birgit Liesenklas: Hanro – The Story of Passion. Hanro AG, Rorschacherberg 2001.
- Hanro. 1884–1959. Hanro AG, Liestal 1959.

== Notes ==
- Hanro Firmengeschichte 1884–1970; undated, no publication location (Typescript. Memories of the Hanro company CEO Eric Handschin (1913–1983), second patron generation). Hanro Collection Liestal, Aktenarchiv Signatur 39-6 (digital version in the Internet Archive.)
