= Soviet Jeans =

2024 Latvian television series

- Latvian: Padomju džinsi
- Genre: Dramedy, romance
- Created by: Staņislavs Tokalovs; Teodora Markova; Waldemar Kalinowski
- Written by: Staņislavs Tokalovs; Teodora Markova; Waldemar Kalinowski
- Directed by: Staņislavs Tokalovs; Juris Kursietis
- Starring: Kārlis Arnolds Avots; Aamu Milonoff; Igors Šelegovskis
- Composer: Kārlis Auzāns
- Country of origin: Latvia
- Original languages: Latvian; Russian; English; Finnish
- No. of seasons: 1
- No. of episodes: 8

Production
- Producer: Aija Bērziņa
- Cinematography: Valdis Celmiņš
- Editor: Oskars Morozs
- Running time: 55 minutes
- Production company: Tasse Film

Original release
- Network: Go3
- Release: 8 April 2024

Soviet Jeans (Latvian: Padomju džinsi) is a 2024 Latvian dramedy television series created by Staņislavs Tokalovs, Teodora Markova and Waldemar Kalinowski, and directed by Tokalovs and Juris Kursietis. Set in Riga in 1979, the eight-part series follows a theatre tailor and black-market trader who is committed to a psychiatric hospital and starts an illicit workshop producing imitation Western jeans.

The series was presented in Berlinale Series Market Selects and became the first Latvian series shown at Series Mania, where it competed in the International Panorama. At Series Mania it received the Audience Award, while Kārlis Arnolds Avots won Best Actor in the International Panorama. It also won three Lielais Kristaps awards, including Best Television Series.

== Premise ==
In the Latvian Soviet Socialist Republic in 1979, Renārs Rubenis works as a tailor at a Riga theatre and supplements his income by trading Western goods on the black market. He falls in love with Tina, a visiting Finnish theatre director, while Māris, a former schoolmate who has become a KGB officer, pressures him to inform on people around the theatre.

After Renārs is detained for a rebellious song and confined to a psychiatric hospital, he uses its sewing workshop to manufacture counterfeit jeans with other patients. The hospital's director profits from the operation, while the popularity of the jeans attracts a KGB investigation. What begins as an attempt to secure Renārs's release develops into a form of resistance to the Soviet system.

== Cast ==
- Kārlis Arnolds Avots as Renārs Rubenis
- Aamu Milonoff as Tina
- Igors Šelegovskis as Māris

The supporting cast includes Gints Grāvelis, Andris Keišs, Indra Briķe, Dainis Gaidelis, Gundars Āboliņš, Ivars Krasts, Jānis Jarāns and Gatis Gāga.

== Production ==
=== Development and writing ===
Tokalovs developed the initial idea more than a decade before production. He said that the story was conceived as a series because the protagonist's gradual understanding of freedom required a longer form. The production described the screenplay as drawing on three true stories from the Soviet period. The creators also researched the political use of psychiatric institutions and the attraction of Western culture in Soviet Latvia.

The creators used tragicomedy rather than treating the period solely as a historical drama. In interviews, they described humour, personal relationships and cultural memory as ways of depicting everyday survival under an authoritarian system without minimising political repression. Cineuropa described the resulting tone as a mixture of romance, prison-escape story and bittersweet humour, with the constant surveillance of the period remaining present beneath the comedy.

=== Filming and financing ===
Principal photography began in April 2023. Tasse Film produced the series, with Aija Bērziņa as producer; the production received support administered by the National Film Centre of Latvia through the European Union's REACT-EU programme and from the Go3 platform. Valdis Celmiņš served as cinematographer, Laura Dišlere as production designer, Oskars Morozs as editor and Kārlis Auzāns as composer. The Dailes Theatre in Riga was both a filming location and the workplace of the principal character.

The dialogue uses Latvian, Russian, English and Finnish, reflecting the setting and the Finnish character Tina. The completed series consists of eight episodes with a total running time of 447 minutes.

== Release and distribution ==
The first two episodes premiered in Riga on 26 February 2024. The series began public cinema screenings in Latvia on 1 March and became available on Go3 on 8 April.

Before its domestic release, Soviet Jeans was included in the 2024 Berlinale Series Market Selects. Its international premiere took place in the International Panorama programme at Series Mania in Lille in March 2024, where the first two episodes were shown. Beta Film acquired the international distribution rights.

By October 2024, distribution agreements included Walter Presents in the United States, Canada, the United Kingdom and Ireland; HBO in Central and Eastern Europe; Arte in Germany and France; Filmin in Spain and Portugal; Voyo in the Czech Republic and Slovakia; and MTVA in Hungary. Arte released the series in its streaming service in May 2025. It was also screened at festivals including the Nordic Film Days Lübeck.

== Reception ==
At Series Mania, Cineuropa critic Stanislas Ide called the series a surprise hit and praised the chemistry of its principal actors, its visual design and its combination of humour with the threat created by constant surveillance. Jürgen Wittner of Kulturnews wrote that the series balanced serious drama and satire while keeping its heightened characters recognisable, and highlighted the acting, dialogue and comic timing.

Jörg Taszman of Filmdienst described the series as complex, strongly acted and effective in depicting both the mechanisms of dictatorship and the desire for freedom; the publication rated it “worth seeing”. In Le Journal du Dimanche, Baptiste Thion praised the performances, pace and the use of humour within a romance set in a paranoid, closely monitored society.

Latvian critic Ieva Viese wrote for LSM that the series used comedy as a form of survival within an oppressive system and praised its carefully selected period details, visual construction and sensitive performances. She described the jeans as developing from a coveted Western object into a wider symbol of freedom.

== Accolades ==
Year	Award	Category	Recipient(s)	Result
2024	Lielais Kristaps	Best Television Series	Soviet Jeans	Won
2024	Lielais Kristaps	Best Scriptwriter	Teodora Markova, Staņislavs Tokalovs and Waldemar Kalinowski	Won
2024	Lielais Kristaps	Best Leading Actor	Kārlis Arnolds Avots	Won
2024	Series Mania	Audience Award	Soviet Jeans	Won
2024	Series Mania	Best Actor – International Panorama	Kārlis Arnolds Avots	Won

In Latvian Television's report on the awards, the creators emphasised that the series had competed with productions made on substantially larger budgets.
