= Delta Galil Industries =

Israeli textile firm

- Traded as: TASE: DELG
- Industry: Textile
- Founded: 1975; 51 years ago
- Founder: Dov Lautman, Eliezer Peleg
- Headquarters: Caesarea, Israel
- Key people: Isaac Dabah, CEO
- Revenue: ▲US$ 2.045 billion (2024)
- Owner: Isaac Dabah (49.21%)
- Number of employees: 25,000 (2024)
- Website: deltagalil.com

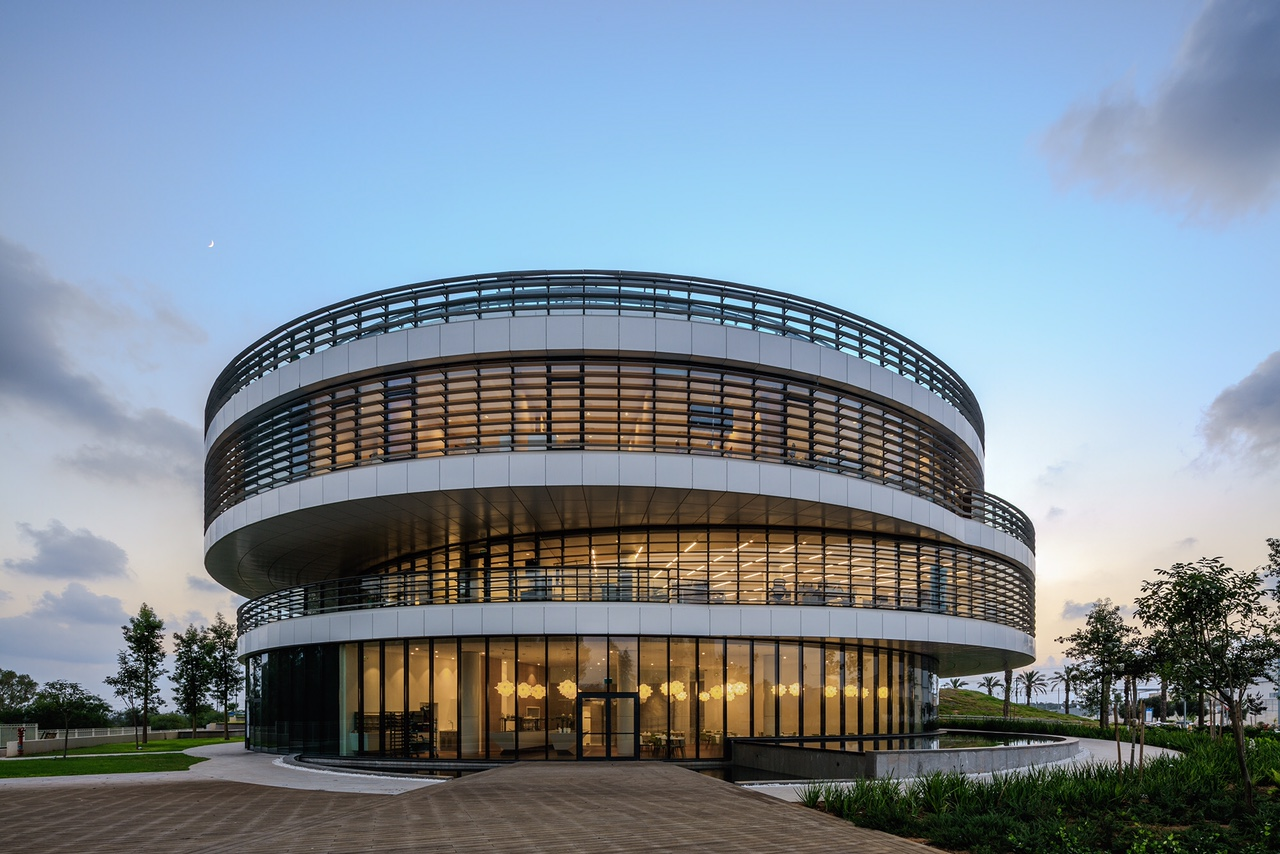
Delta Galil's global headquarters in Caesarea.

Delta Galil Industries (Hebrew: דלתא גליל תעשיות) is a global designer, manufacturer and marketer of branded and private label apparel products for men, women and children.

The majority of Delta Galil’s shares are held by Mr. Isaac Dabah (49.21%), with total revenue of over $2.045 billion in 2024.

== Overview ==
Delta Galil Industries was founded in 1975 by Dov Lautman and Eliezer Peleg. It produces men and women's underwear, bras, socks, baby clothing, leisurewear, nightwear, knitted fabrics, elastic ribbons and trimmings. In 2007, GMM Capital, owned by Isaac Dabah, becomes the main shareholder. Under his leadership the Company went through a major change while adopting a growth strategy. Since his tenure the Company has entered into new markets, expanded its manufacturing, marketing and selling presence around the globe and experienced substantial growth in earnings.

In 2024, Delta Galil Formed a joint venture with Reliance Industries to enter the Indian market.

Delta Galil operates 3 R&D centers for socks, and bras.

Delta Galil employs around 25,000 people worldwide from 4 continents.

== See also ==
- Israeli fashion
- Economy of Israel
- List of Israeli companies quoted on the Nasdaq
