= History of bras =

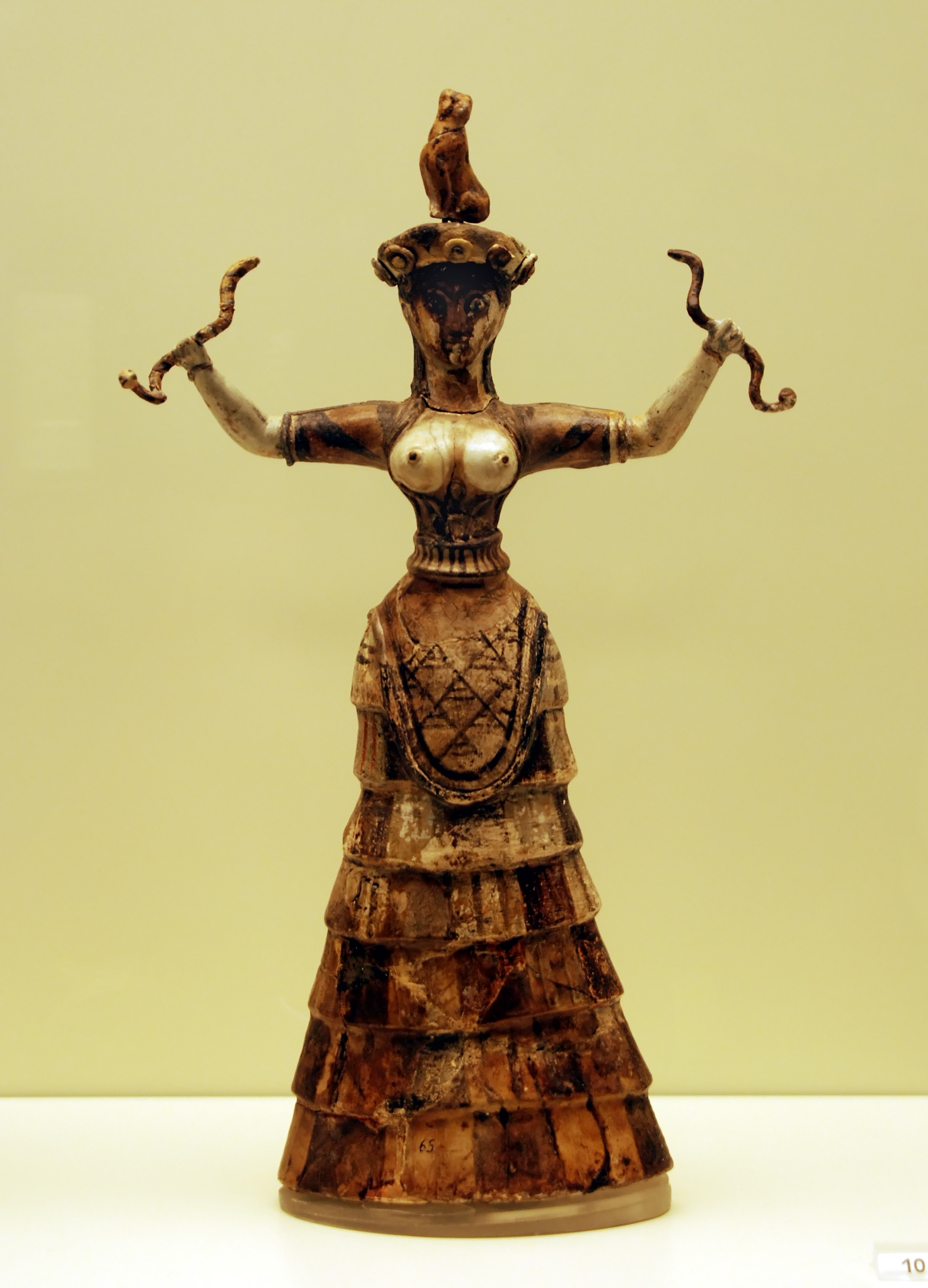
Snake Goddess from ancient Crete, with the breasts supported by a fitted corset-like garment, c. 1600 BCE

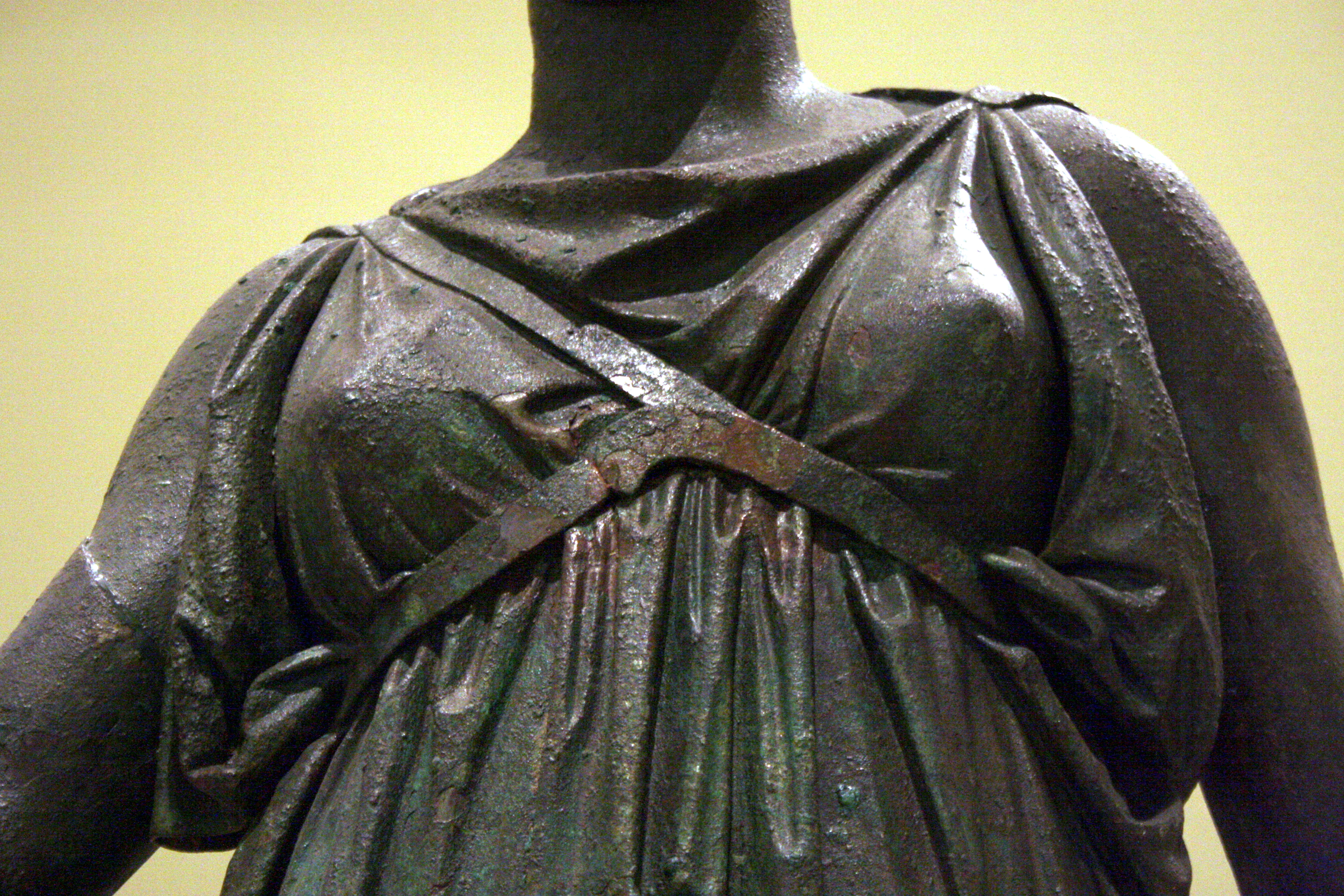
Y-shaped breast bands on a bronze statue of Artemis, (mid-4th century BCE).

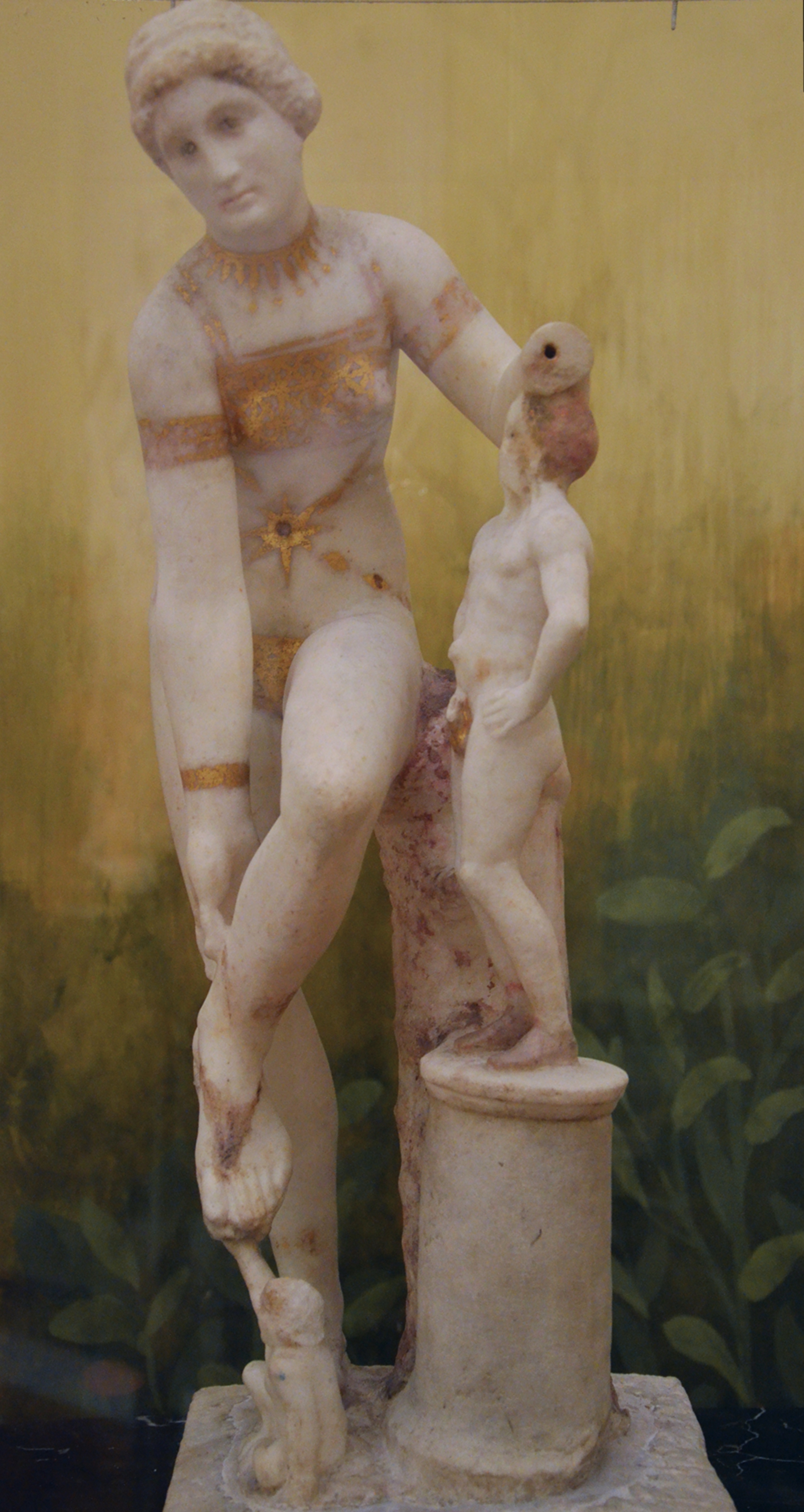
Aphrodite in a gold "bikini"; Roman copy of a Hellenistic statue, Pompeii

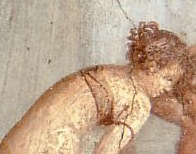
Wall painting at Pompeii, 62–79 CE, showing a mamillare

The history of bras (brassières; variously pronounced) is closely tied to the social status of women, the evolution of fashion, and shifting views of the female body over time.

Throughout history, women have used various garments to support, cover, restrain, reveal, enhance, or modify the appearance of their breasts. Artifacts from the Minoan civilization, dating back to the 14th century BCE, depict women wearing bikini-like garments. Some evidence suggests that during the Greco-Roman period, women had developed specialized bra-like garments to support their breasts. By the 14th century CE, the proto-bra was in development in Europe.

From approximately the 16th century CE onward, the corset dominated the undergarments of wealthier women in the Western world. Corsets came in varying lengths, with some designed only to support the bust, while others extended down to shape the waist. In the latter part of the 19th century, women experimented with various alternatives, such as splitting the corset into a girdle-like shaping device for the lower torso and transferring the upper part to devices suspended from the shoulder.

By the early 20th century, garments emerged that more closely resembled contemporary bras; however, large-scale commercial production only occurred in the 1930s. The metal shortages of World War II encouraged the demise of the corset, and most fashion-conscious women in Europe and North America were wearing bras by the end of the war. The bra was then adopted by women in other parts of the world, including Asia, Africa, and Latin America.

== Antiquity ==
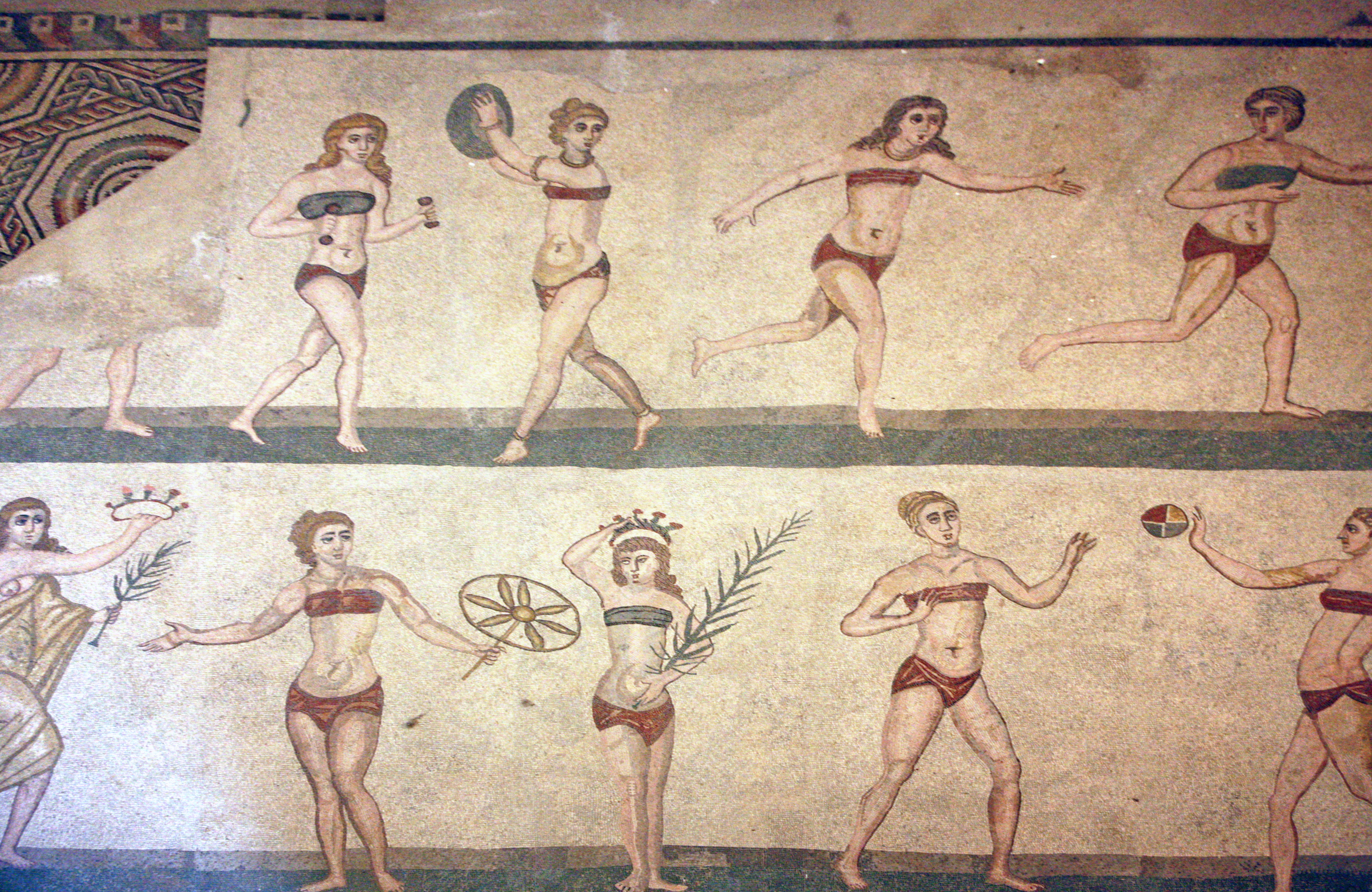
The Coronation of the Winner, 4th century CE

=== Greece ===
Literature from Ancient Greece suggests the use of a specialized garment meant to support and contain women's breasts. In Book 14 of Homer's Iliad, written in the archaic period of classical antiquity, Homer refers to Aphrodite's "embroidered girdle" (Ancient Greek: κεστός ἱμάς, kestós himás) as being "loosed from her breasts", indicating a decorated breast-band rather than a girdle or belt, as is often interpreted. At least one example of late-Hellenic sculpture seems to confirm this, depicting the goddess wrapping a stróphion (from stróphos "twisted band" + the diminutive suffix -ion) around her chest.

Aristophanes mentions the stróphion in his plays Lysistrata and Women at the Thesmophoria. However, it is unknown if the stróphion was an everyday garment worn by the average woman or an item of clothing reserved for certain situations or specific types of women. Artifacts from the Minoan civilization, dating back to the 14th century BCE, depict women wearing bikini-like garments. However, most early Grecian sculpture and vase paintings that depict undressed women show no indication of breast bands, instead revealing the shape of the breast through draped clothing, or even the nipple itself, with no sign of an intervening item of clothing between dress and skin.

=== Rome ===
The Roman adaptation of the strophium was mentioned in writings by Martial, Ovid, and in the Scriptores Historiae Augustae as the fascia, fasciola, taenia, or mamillare. This garment was made from various materials. It is depicted in the Coronation of the Winner mosaic, nicknamed "Bikini Mosaic", dated to the 4th century CE, at Villa Romana del Casale in Piazza Armerina, Sicily. In the mosaic, the bra-wearing women are participating in sporting events. In addition, some large-breasted Roman women wore a mamillare under tunics and togas because Romans considered large breasts to be "grandmotherly".

== The Middle Ages ==
By the High Middle Ages, some women in Western Europe were using bra-like garments to support and restrain their breasts. Both Henri de Mondeville, surgeon to King Phillip the Fair of France, and Konrad Stolle, writing over a hundred years apart (c. 1315 CE and c. 1480 CE, respectively), mention "breast bags" or "shirts with bags" that women used to contain their breasts. Stolle called these inventions "indecent". A 15th-century anonymous German writer said many women made and wore these garments, noting the benefits for one woman: "All the young men that look at her, can see her beautiful breasts..." In this era, women of status wore clothing that required specialized undergarments with separated cups that lifted and separated the breasts.

15th-century playing cards and illustrated manuscripts provide visible evidence of these garments. In 2008, fragments of four bra-like undergarments were discovered in Lengberg Castle in Austria. Dating to the 15th century, the garments represent three different designs but all had separate cups. They were probably worn attached to skirts, but the skirts were removed when the garments were discarded, perhaps to reuse the fabric.

== The corset ==
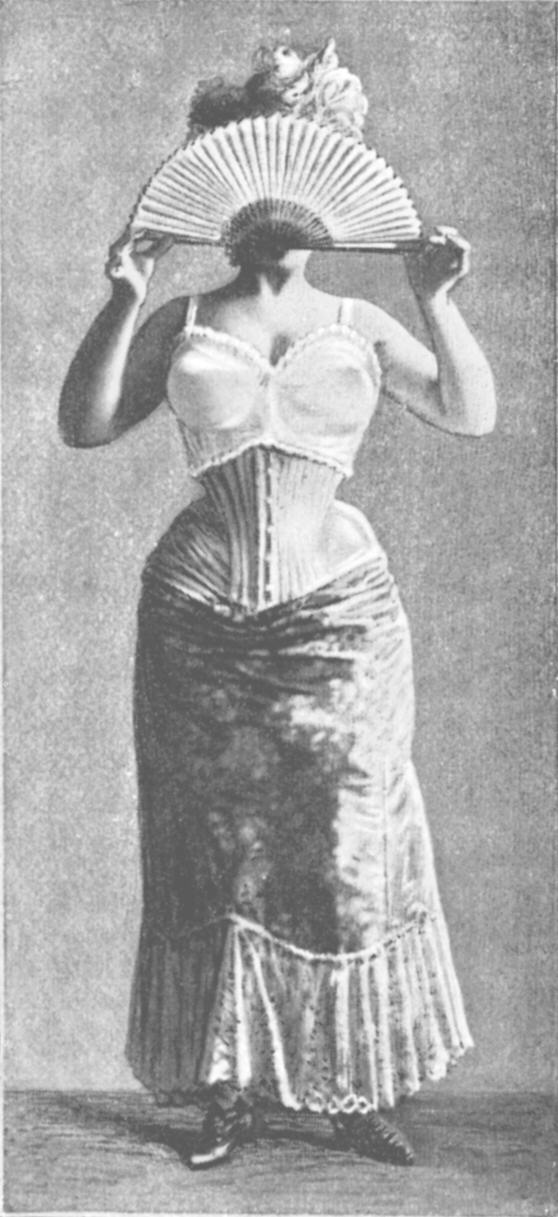
Support of the bosom by a pair of bodies (French: brassière). 1900.

=== Bodies ===
The inventor of the corset is unclear, but it appeared around the turn of the 16th century CE. During this period, the lifted, separated "apple breasts" look of the Middle Ages, began to go out of fashion and was replaced with the look of a compressed bust. The corset was originally called a paire de corps or "a pair of bodies" in English because they came in two pieces. It gave the chest and torso a smooth, conical shape that worked with the farthingale to create the illusion of a tiny waist.

In the mid-17th century, pairs of bodies began to be called "stays" and were usually boned with baleen instead of reeds. Some of these bodies were made in one piece but retained the same general shape and did not feature cups like a bra. This style remained unchanged until the end of the 18th century.

=== Short stays ===
In the 1780s and 1790s, the shape of stays changed radically to suit the changing fashions. However, many of these "shortened stays" or "short stays", as they were sometimes called in Britain, resembled earlier support Middle Ages garments more than stays, with fitted cups that held the breasts apart and bands only as wide as the ribs or shorter, instead of waist-length. Around this time, the French started to refer to stays as corsets.

== Victorian era ==
=== Victorian dress reform movement ===
During the 19th century, two parallel movements drove the evolution of the bra from the corset: health professionals' concerns about the cruel, constraining effects of the corset and the clothing reform movement of feminists who believed women needed to discard the corset before they could expand their roles in society. Reformed Amelia Bloomer said, "When you find a burden in belief or apparel, cast it off".

American women who made important contributions to the corset reform movement included Amelia Bloomer and Dr. Mary Edwards Walker. In the United Kingdom, notable figures in the movement included Constance Lloyd, wife of Oscar Wilde. The Rational Dress Society, the National Dress Reform Association, and the Reform Dress Association were prominent organizations that advocated for the end of the corset.

Despite the dress reform movement, early bras had limited commercial success. Only well-educated, wealthy reformers wore them to any significant degree because they were expensive.

=== Early designs and patents ===
Numerous patents for bra-like devices were granted in the 19th century, indicating developments in the invention of the modern bra. A bra-like device that gave a "symmetrical rotundity" to the wearer's breasts was patented in 1859 by Henry S. Lesher of Brooklyn, New York. In 1863, a "corset substitute" was patented by Luman L. Chapman of Camden, New Jersey. Historians refer to it as a "proto-bra".

In 1876, dressmaker Olivia Flynt was granted four patents covering the "True Corset" or "Flynt Waist" which was designed for larger-breasted women. Reformers probably purchased and helped create a demand for these early garments on "hygienic" grounds over health concerns about the corset. Initially, Flynt's garments were available by mail order but eventually appeared in department and clothing stores. She won a bronze medal for her designs at the Massachusetts Charitable Mechanics Association in 1878, at the Cotton States and International Exposition in Atlanta from 1884 to 1885, and at the World's Columbian Exposition in Chicago in 1893.

According to Life magazine, Herminie Cadolle of France invented the first modern bra in 1889. It appeared in a corset catalog as a two-piece undergarment, which she originally called the corselet gorge and later le bien-être or "the well-being". Her garment cut the traditional corset in two: The lower part was a corset for the waist, and the upper part supported the breasts with shoulder straps. Her description reads, "designed to sustain the bosom and supported by the shoulders." She patented her invention and showed it at the Paris Exposition Universelle in 1889. By 1905, the upper half was sold separately as a soutien-gorge, the name by which bras are still known in France. She also introduced the use of rubber thread or elastic. Her company is still family-owned and claims that Cadolle freed women by inventing the first Bra."

In 1893, Marie Tucek received a U.S. patent for a device that consisted of separate pockets for each breast above a metal supporting plate, with shoulder straps fastened by hook-and-eye. This invention was a precursor to the underwire bra.

The bra was initially worn as an alternative to the corset, as a negligée or at-home wear, or was worn by women with medical issues stemming from corsets. After the straight-fronted corset became fashionable in the early 20th century, a bra or "bust supporter" became a necessity for full-busted women because the straight-fronted corset did not offer as much support and containment as the Victorian styles. Early bras were either wrap-around bodices or boned, close-fitting camisoles (both worn over the corset). They were designed to hold the bust in and down against the corset, which provided upward support.

Advertising of the times, typically in periodicals, stressed the advantages of bras in health and comfort over corsets and portrayed garments with shoulder supports in a mono-bosom style and with limited adaptability. Their major appeal was to those for whom lung function and mobility were priorities rather than outer appearance. Home-sewn garments competed with factory-made, ready-to-wear garments.

== 20th-century designs ==
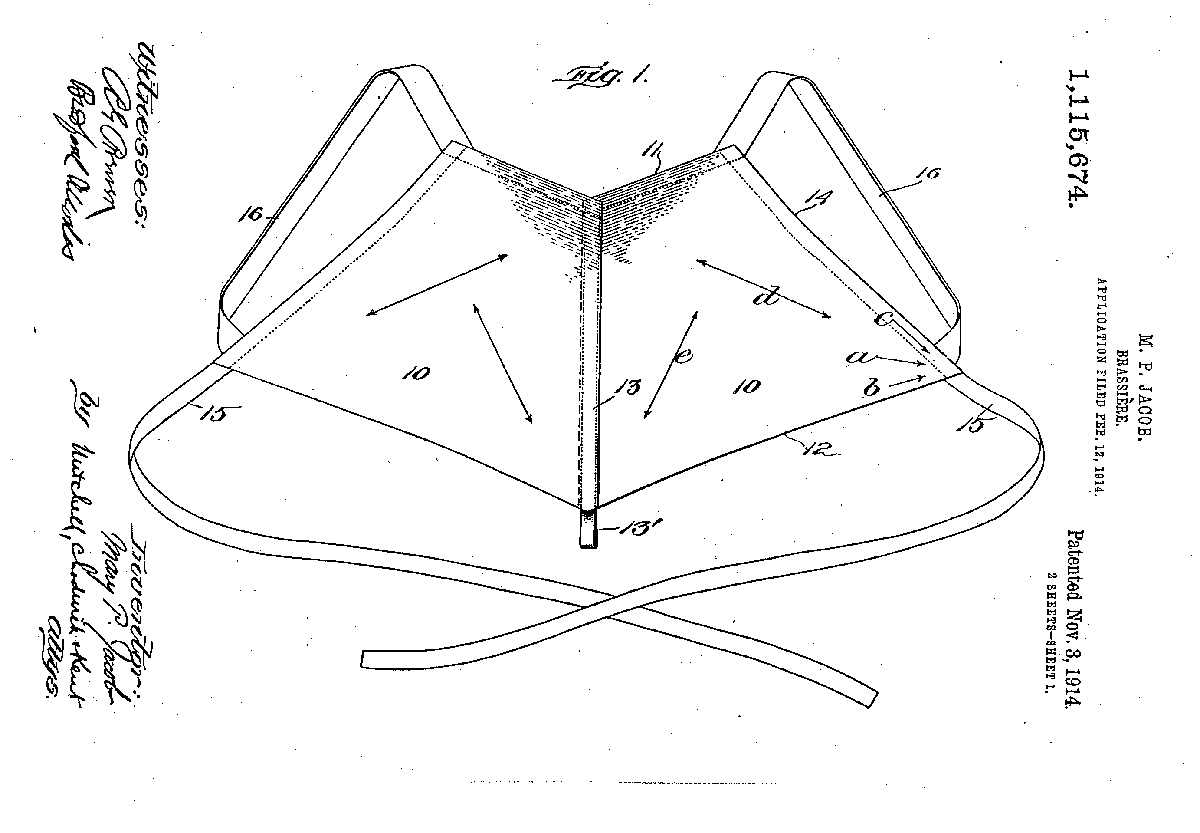
Jacob's brassiere, from the original patent application

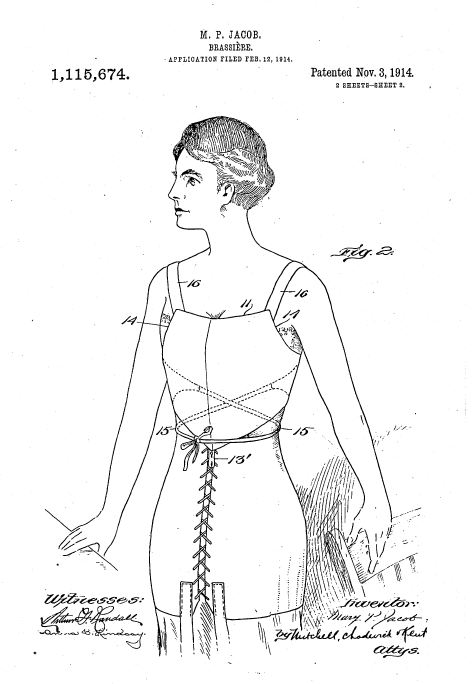
Jacob's brassiere, from the original patent application

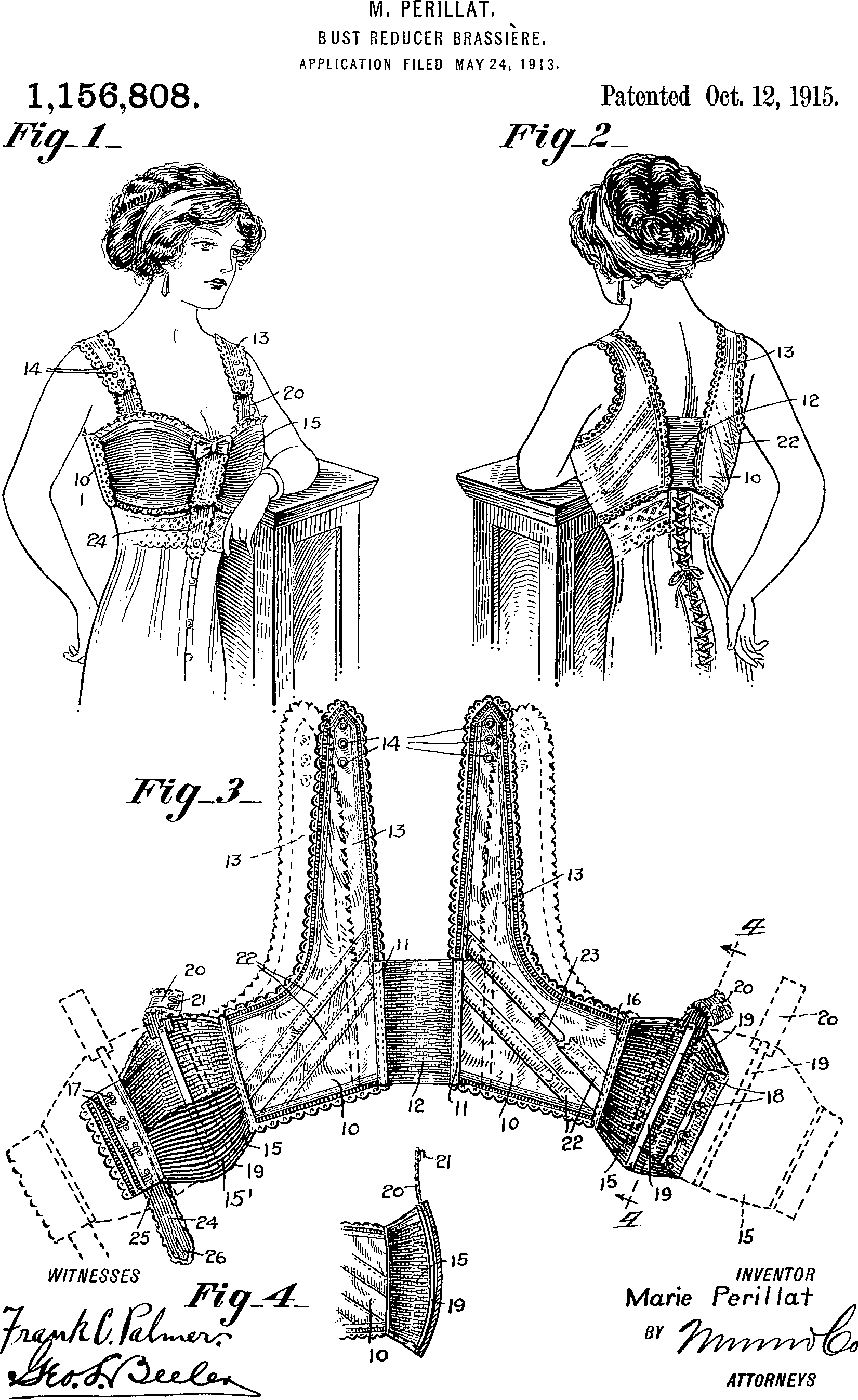
1913 Bust reducing bra, US Patent 1156808

The word "brassiere" was first used in Vogue magazine in 1907 to describe a device that supported the breasts. The word brassiere was added to the Oxford English Dictionary in 1911.

=== The 1910s ===
Sigmund Lindauer from Stuttgart-Bad Cannstatt, Germany, developed a bra for mass production in 1912 and patented it in 1913. Mechanische Trikotweberei Ludwig Maier & Cie. AG mass-produced his design in Böblingen, Germany. With metal shortages, World War I encouraged the end of the corset. When the war ended, most fashion-conscious women in Europe and North America wore bras. From there, the bra was adopted by women in Asia, Africa, and Latin America.

In 1910, Mary Phelps Jacob (known later in life as Caresse Crosby), a 19-year-old New York socialite, purchased a sheer evening gown for a debutante ball. At that time, the only acceptable undergarment was a corset stiffened with whalebone. Mary had large breasts and found the whalebone visibly poked out around her plunging neckline and from under the sheer fabric. Dissatisfied with this arrangement, she worked with her maid to fashion two silk handkerchiefs with a pink ribbon and cord.Her innovation drew immediate attention that evening, and she made more of her new device for family and friends. When a stranger offered her a dollar for one, she realized that her device could turn into a viable business.

On November 3, 1914, the U.S. Patent Office issued the first U.S. patent for the "Backless Bra". Crosby's patent was for a lightweight, soft, and comfortable device that naturally separated the breasts; in contrast with the corset, which was heavy, stiff, uncomfortable, and had the effect of creating a "monobosom". Crosby secured some orders from department stores, but her business never took off. Her husband, Harry Crosby, discouraged her from pursuing the business and persuaded her to close it. She later sold the bra patent to the Warners Brothers Corset Company in Bridgeport, Connecticut, for $1,500 ($24,107 in today's money). Warner manufactured the "Crosby" bra for a while, but it did not become popular and was eventually discontinued. Warner went on to earn more than $15 million from the bra patent over the next thirty years.

Bras became more common and widely promoted throughout the 1910s, aided by the continuing trend towards lighter, shorter corsets that offered increasingly less bust support and containment. At the beginning of the U.S. involvement in World War I in 1917, the U.S. War Industries Board asked women to stop buying corsets to free up metal for war production. This was said to have saved some 28,000 tons of metal, enough to build two battleships.

In addition to helping to liberate women from corsets, World War I also changed gender roles as women filled labor shortages by working in factories and wearing uniforms. However, women were already moving into the retail and clerical sectors. Thus the bra emerged from something that was once discreetly tucked into the back pages of women's magazines in the 1890s to prominent display in department stores such as Sears, Roebuck, and Montgomery Ward by 1918. Advertising began to promote shaping the bust to meet contemporary fashion demands, and sales reflected this need.

=== The 1920s ===
Fashion of the 1920s included the "boyish" silhouette of the flapper, with little bust definition. The term flapper, which in the mid-1910s referred to pre- and early-teenage girls, was adopted by the J. Walter Thompson advertising agency in the 1920s for their younger adult customers. The androgynous figure, then in style, downplayed women's natural curves through a bandeau bra, which flattened breasts. It was relatively easy for small-busted women to conform to the flat-chested look of the Flapper era. Women with larger breasts tried products like the popular Symington Side Lacer that, when laced at the sides, pulled and helped to flatten women's chests. However, some "bras" of the early 1920s were little more than camisoles.

In 1922, Russian immigrant Ida Rosenthal was a seamstress at Enid Frocks, a small New York City dress shop. She and her husband, William Rosenthal, and shop owner Enid Bissett changed the look of women's fashion. They noticed that a bra that fit one woman did not fit another woman with the same bra band size. They developed bras for all ages with $4,500 invested in their new business. Their innovation was designed to make their dresses look better on the wearer by increasing the shaping of the bandeau bra to enhance and support women's breasts. They named the company Maiden Form, a deliberate contrast with the name of a competitor, Boyishform Company. Maiden Form routed Boyishform by 1924, by accenting and lifting rather than flattening the bust. In 1927, William Rosenthal, the president of Maiden Form, filed patents for full-figured nursing and the first seamed uplift bra.

These fashion changes coincided with health professionals beginning to link breast care and comfort to motherhood and lactation with a campaign against breast flattening. The emphasis shifted from minimizing the breasts to uplifting and accenting them. Women, especially the younger set, welcomed the bra as a modern garment.

While manufacturing was becoming more organized, homemade bras and bandeaux were still quite popular. Homemade bras were usually made of white cotton and were little more than bust bodices that provided some separation.

=== The 1930s ===
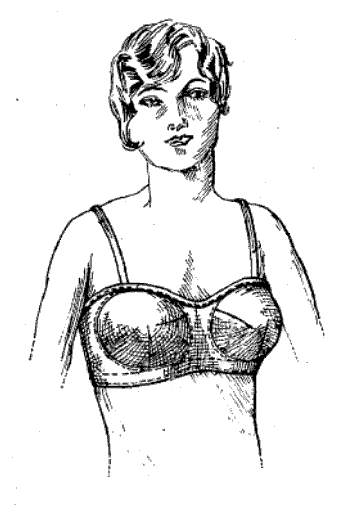
Drawing of a woman wearing a bra, from February 28, 1930, U.S. Patent 1825579 application

The culturally preferred silhouette among Western women during the 1930s was a pointy bust, which further increased demand for a forming garment. The word "brassiere" was gradually shortened to "bra" in the 1930s. According to a 1934 survey by Harper's Bazaar, "bra" was the most commonly used expression for the garment among college women. In October 1932, the S.H. Camp and Company correlated the size and pendulousness of a woman's breasts to letters of the alphabet, ranging from A through D. In February 1933, Camp's advertising featured letter-labeled profiles of breasts in Corset and Underwear Review. In 1937, Warner began to feature cup sizing in its products. Two other companies, Model and Fay-Miss, began to offer A, B, C, and D cups in the late 1930s. Catalog companies continued to use the designations Small, Medium, and Large through the 1940s.

Other innovations included the Warners' use of elastic, the adjustable strap, the sized cup, and padded bras for smaller-breasted women. There were also advances in fiber technology, fabrics, colors, patterns, and options. Adjustable bands were also introduced in the 1930s, using multiple eye and hook positions.

Bras rapidly became a major industry over the 1930s, outperforming other industries. In the U.S., production moved outside New York and Chicago, and advertising became more specialized and began to exploit Hollywood glamour. Much of this marketing was aimed at young women. Saleswomen played a crucial role in helping clients find fitting garments in newly added fitting areas. Manufacturers even arranged fitting training courses for sales assistants.

International sales started to form an increasing part of the U.S. bra manufacturer's market. Prices started to make bras available to a broader market, and homemade competition dwindled. Other major manufacturers of the 1930s included Triumph, Maidenform, Gossard (Courtaulds), Spirella, Spencer, Twilfit, and Symington.

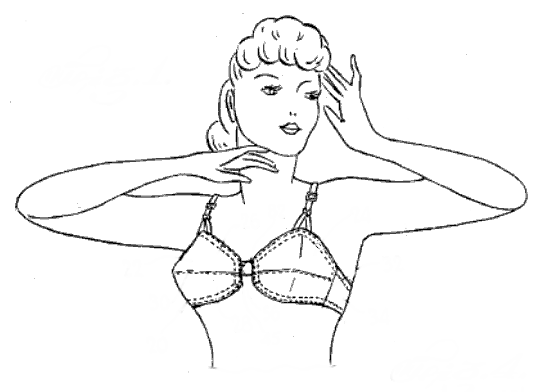
Drawing of a woman wearing a bra from a 1947 U.S. patent application

=== The 1940s ===
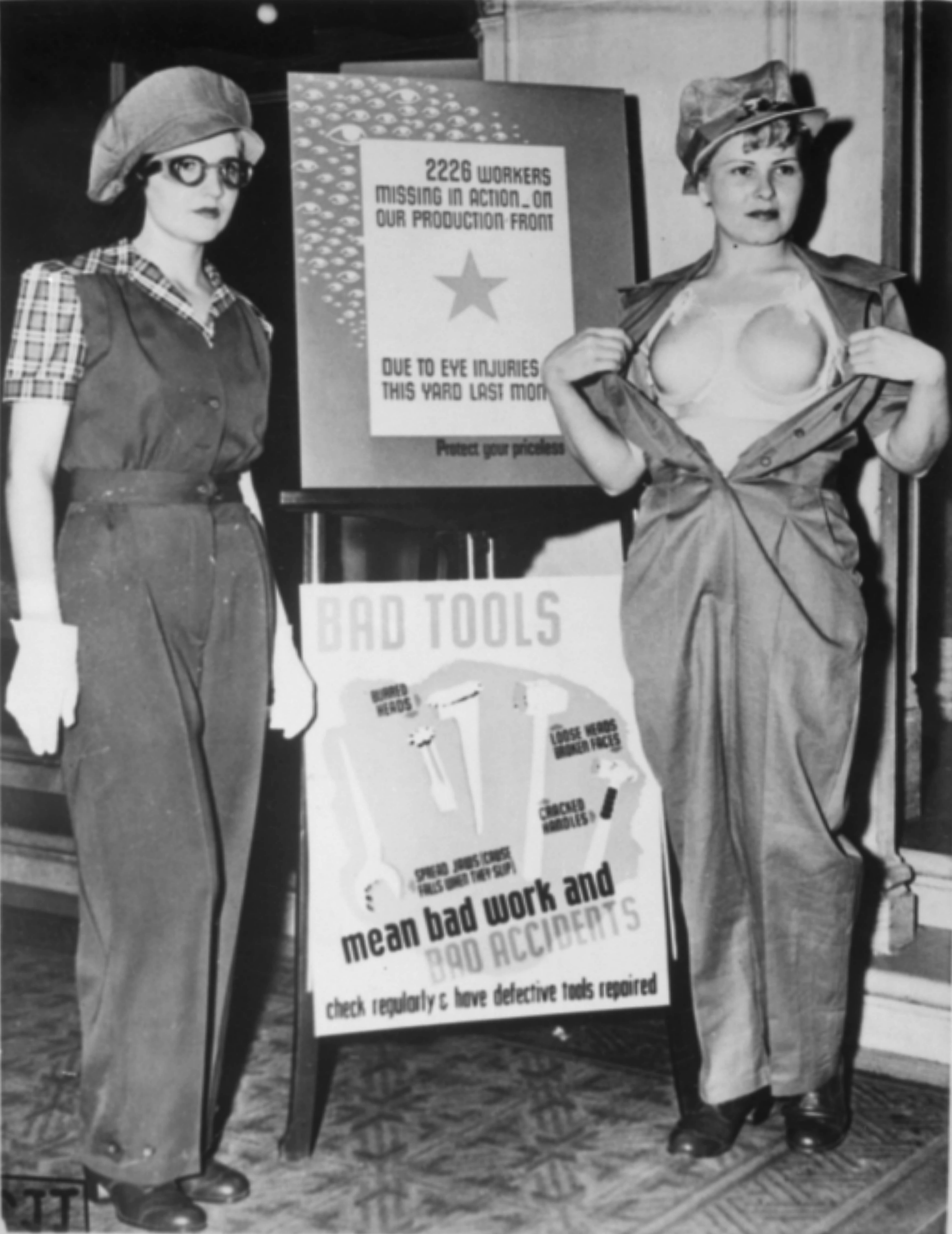
Two women show off a new uniform, including a plastic bra designed to help prevent occupational accidents, Los Angeles,1943

World War II had a significant impact on clothing. In the United States, women were enlisted in the lower ranks of the military for the first time and were fitted with uniform underwear. Women's occupations shifted dramatically, with far more employed outside the home. Willson Goggles, a Pennsylvania firm manufacturing safety equipment for manual workers, is believed to have introduced the plastic "SAF-T-BRA", designed to protect women on the factory floor. Dress codes appeared – for example, Lockheed informed their workers that bras must be worn because of "good taste, anatomical support, and morale."

Advertising in the 1940s appealed to patriotism and the concept that bras and girdles were somehow "protection". Advertising, promotion, and consumerism started to be directed at minorities (e.g., Ebony in 1945) and teens. Military terminology crept into product marketing, as represented by the highly structured, conically pointed Torpedo or Bullet bra designed for "maximum projection". Exaggerating breast size, bullet bras became fashionable. Pin-ups of models and actresses wearing tight-fitting outer garments over their bullet bras became known as sweater girls.

The war presented unique challenges for the industry as material shortages limited design choices. As in World War I, there was concern about the use of badly needed steel in corsets; in 1941, the British Government carried out a survey of women's usage of underwear that showed that "on average, women-owned 1.2 bras (housewives 0.8 and agricultural workers 1.9)." Many manufacturers only survived by making tents and parachutes in addition to bras. However, the war also freed the American industry from European influences, particularly French, and became more distinctive.

=== The 1950s ===
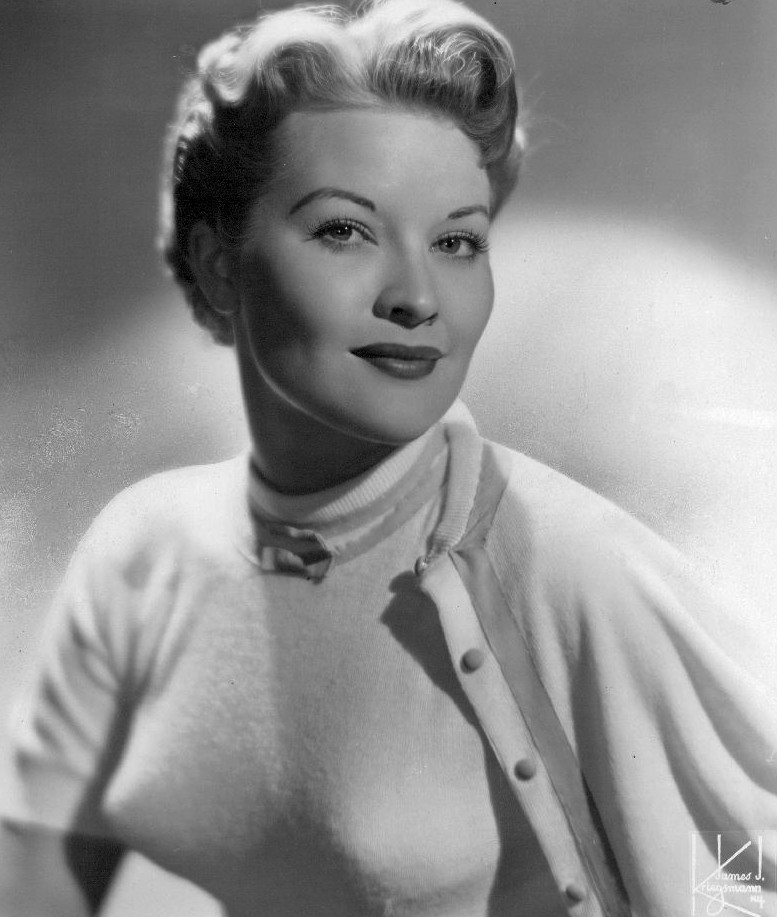
Patti Page wearing a bullet bra, 1955

New kinds of material were increasingly available post-war. Production and marketing increased, creating a demand for a greater variety of consumer goods, including bras. The baby boom created a demand for maternity and nursing bras and television provided new promotional opportunities. Manufacturers responded with new fabrics, colors, patterns, styles, padding, and elasticity. DuPont created lycra; this synthetic material was stretchy and helped create bras that seemed molded to a woman's shape.

Bras for pre-teens and girls entering puberty were first marketed during the 1950s. Before introducing training bras, young girls in Western countries usually wore a one-piece "waist" or camisole without cups or darts.

=== The 1960s ===
The 1960s reflected an increasing interest in quality and fashion. Maternity and mastectomy bras began to find new respectability, and the increasing use of washing machines created a need for more durable products. While girdles gave way to pantyhose, the bra continued to evolve. Marketing campaigns like those for the "Snoozable" and "Sweet Dreams" promoted wearing a bra 24 hours a day.

In October 1964, fashion designer Rudy Gernreich released the Exquisite Form "No Bra", a soft-cup, lightweight, seamless, sheer nylon and elastic tricot bra in sizes 32 to 36, with A and B cups. His minimalist bra was a revolutionary departure from the heavy, torpedo-shaped bras of the 1950s and initiated a trend toward more natural shapes and soft, sheer fabrics. He also designed the "All-in-None" with a deep, plunging front and the "No-Back" long-line version, which featured a contoured stretch waistband that allowed a woman to wear a backless dress.

The Wonderbra was created in 1964 by Louise Poirier for Canadelle, a Canadian lingerie company. It has 54 design elements that lift and support the bustline while creating a deep plunge and push-together effect. First-year sales for the Wonderbra were approximated at US $120 million (equivalent to $1.245708155×10^{9} in 2025). Canadelle positioned Wonderbra as a romantic, fashionable, and sexy brand.

=== The 1970s ===
In the 1970s, many American bra manufacturers moved production offshore like other garment makers.

With the growing popularity of jogging and other forms of exercise, there was a need for an athletic garment for women's breasts. The first commercially available sports bra was the "Free Swing Tennis Bra", introduced by Glamorise Foundations, Inc. in 1975.

The first general exercise bra, initially called a "jockbra", was invented in 1977 by Lisa Lindahl and theater costume designer Polly Smith with the help of Smith's assistant, Hinda Schreiber. Lindahl and her sister, Victoria Woodrow, complained about their bad experience exercising in ordinary bras, having experienced runaway straps, chafing, and sore breasts. During Lindahl and Smith's exploration for an alternative, it was suggested that they needed a jockstrap for women's breasts. In the Royall Tyler Theatre costume shop at the University of Vermont, Lindahl and Smith sewed two jockstraps together and nicknamed it a "jockbra". It was later renamed a "jog bra". One of their original Jogbras is bronzed and on display near the theatre's costume shop. Two others are housed by the Smithsonian, and another by the New York Metropolitan Museum of Art.

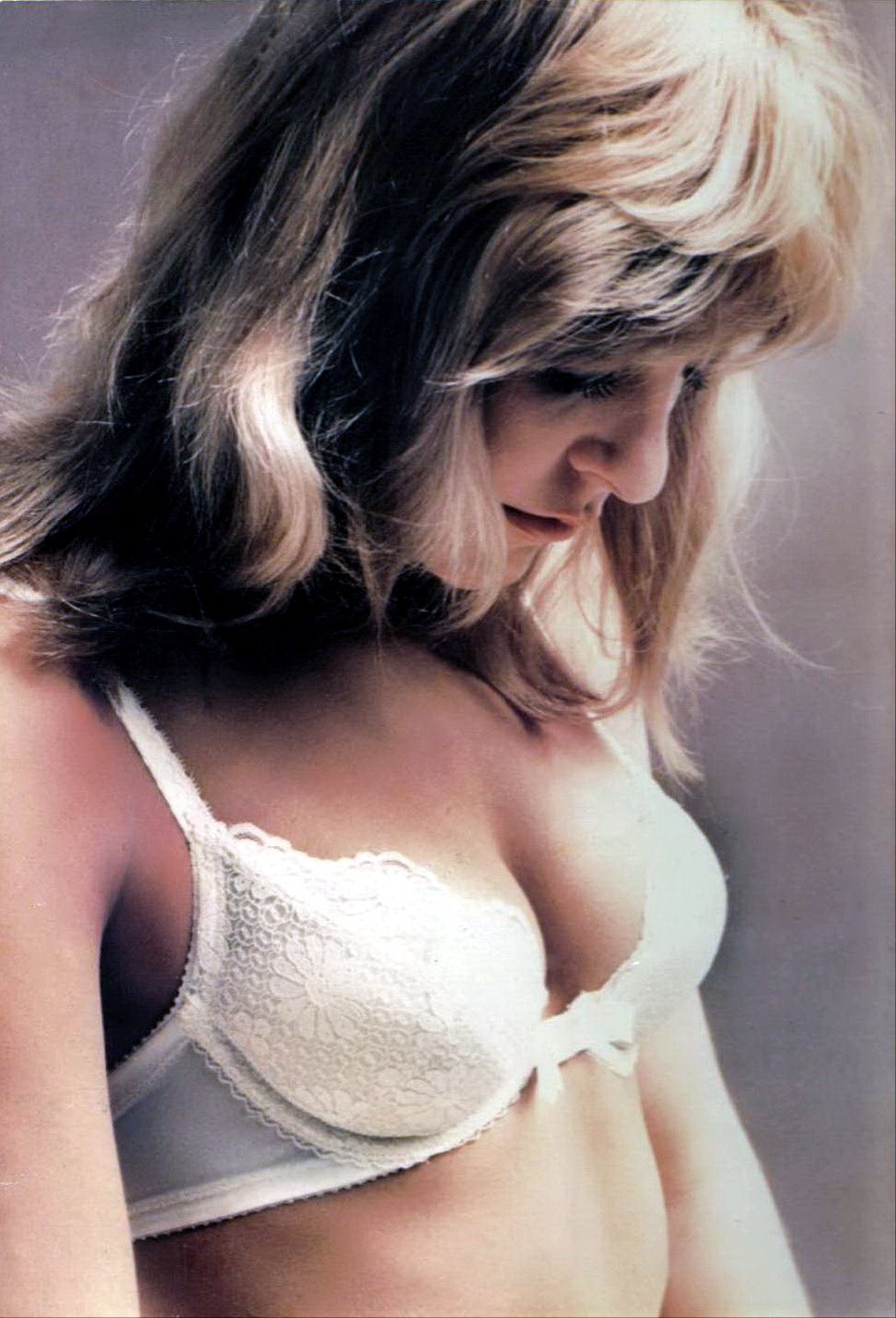
A Canadian brand, Wonderbra, plunge, push-up bra, c. 1975

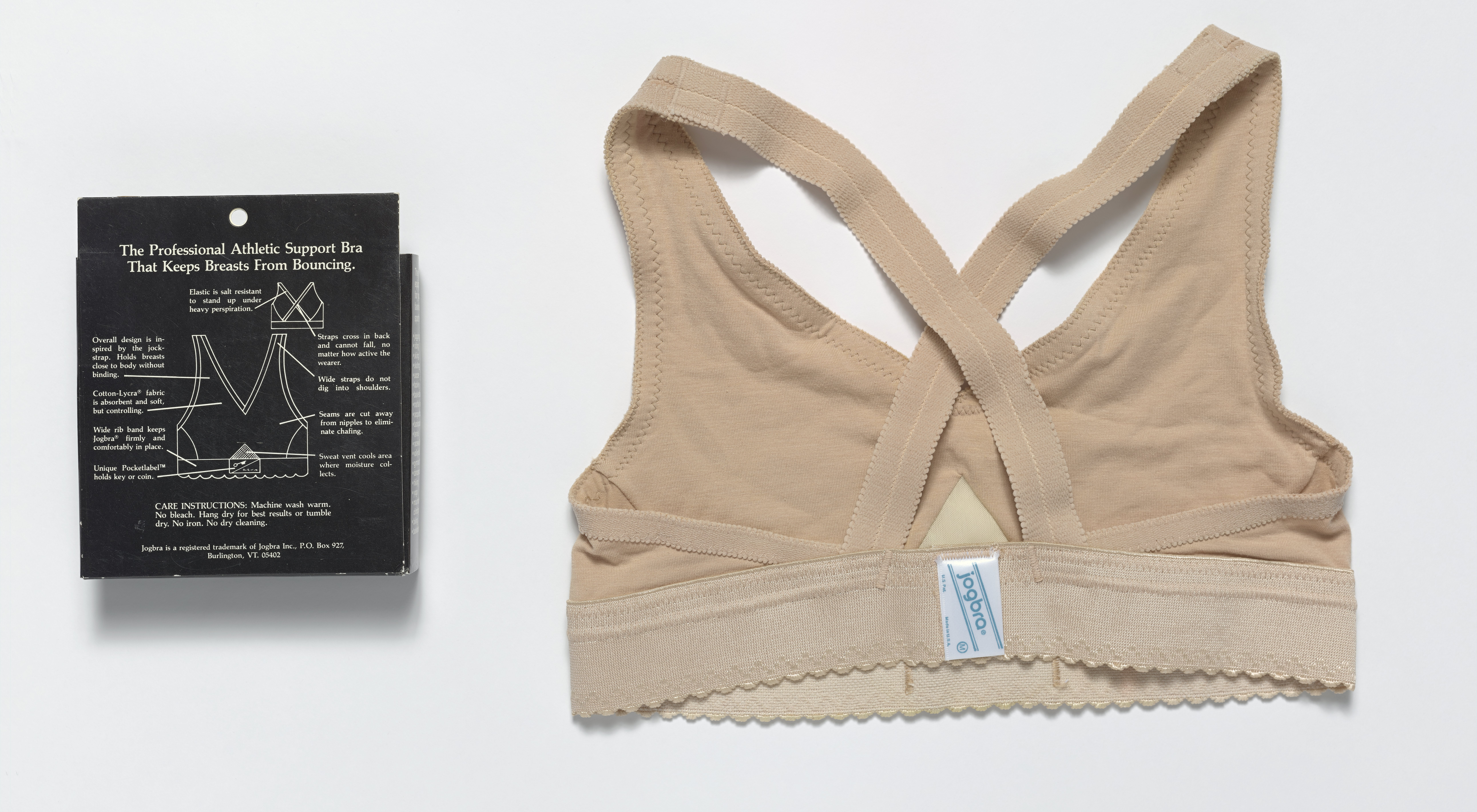
Jogbra, back view with packaging, "The Professional Athletic Support Bra That Keeps Breasts from Bouncing."

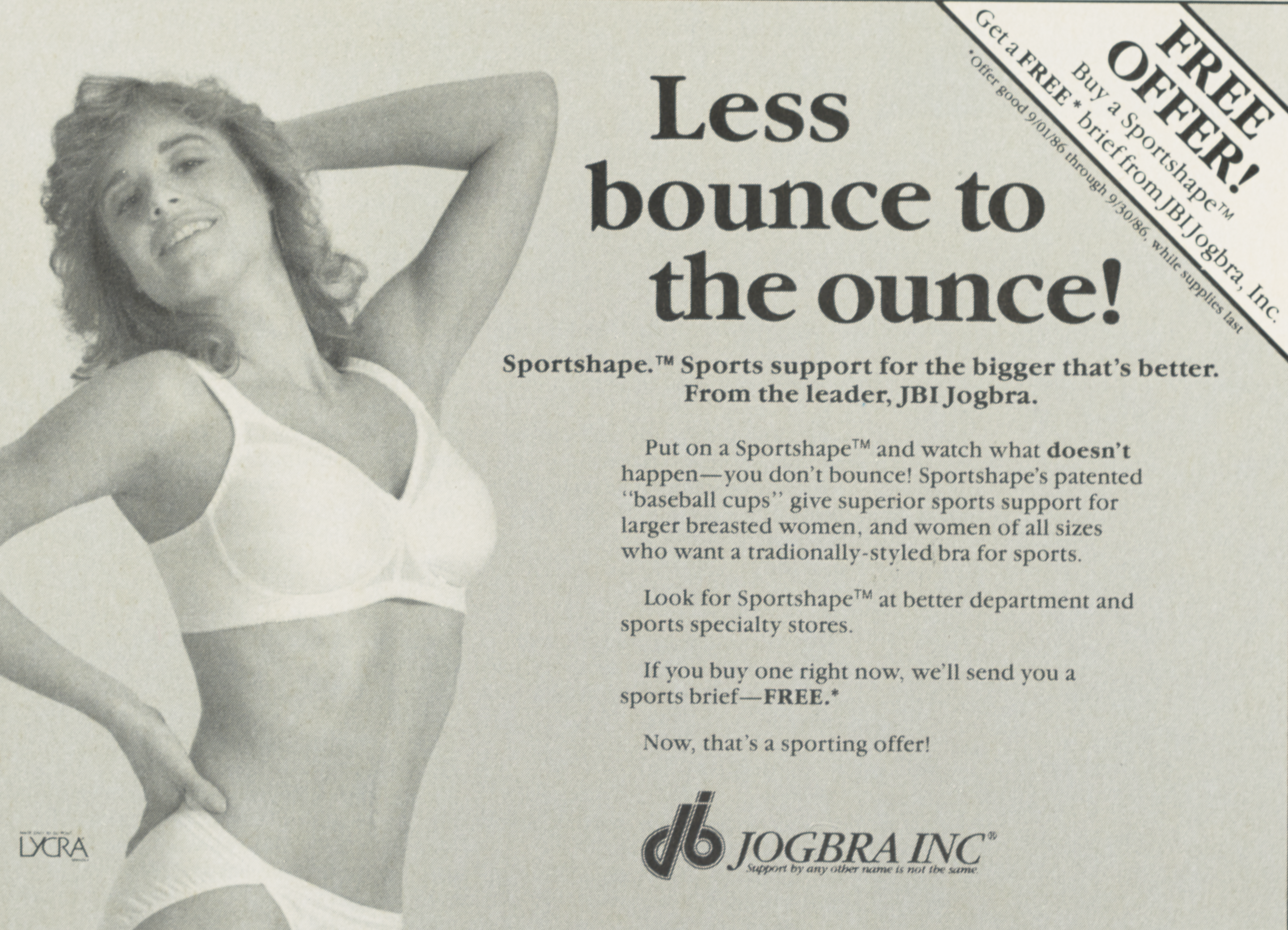
Sportshape JogBra Advertisement, 1986, emphasizes support for larger-breasted women who choose to be active.

=== The 1980s and 1990s ===
Throughout the 1980s fashion led the way in the look and feel of bras. Western television shows featured classy, powerful, and well-formed ladies, usually donning low-cut tops to show an enhanced chest with an equally classy matching bra. An increase in silicone breast implants created a need for bigger and more supportive bras. Models and celebrities donned fashionable and extravagant bras, so showing these at red-carpet events became the norm.

During the 1990s, marketing, and advertising often appealed to fashion and image over fit, comfort, and function. Starting in 1994, manufacturers re-focused advertising, moving from the functionality of support and foundation to selling fashion lingerie, often with impractical additions such as scratchy lace. Notably, Victoria's Secret became popular with its sexy ads featuring supermodels Alessandra Ambrosio, Tyra Banks, Gisele Bundchen, Naomi Campbell, Laetitia Casta, Helena Christensen, Eva Herzigova, Heidi Klum, and Adriana Lima.

=== The 2000s ===
By 2001, bras were a $15 billion industry in the United States and a £1 billion industry in the United Kingdom. Large corporations such as HanesBrands Inc. controlled most bra manufacturing., Gossard, Berlei, and Courtaulds controlled 34% of the UK market.

Two design challenges that bra manufacturers faced in the 2000s seemed paradoxical. On the one hand, there was a demand for minimal bras that allow plunging necklines and reduce interference with the lines of outer garments, such as the shelf bra. On the other hand, body mass and bust size were increasing, leading to a higher demand for larger sizes. Over ten years, the most common size purchased in the United Kingdom went from 34B to 36C. In 2001, 27% of United Kingdom sales were D or larger.

The 2000s brought two large design changes to the bra. The molded one-piece, seamless bra cup became ubiquitous. These bras are heat-molded around round synthetic fibers or foam forms that keep their rounded shape. This construction can include padded bras, contour bras, and "T-shirt bras". Floral or patterned prints also became popular in the 2000s.

In 2008, pop singer Madonna started a fashion trend by wearing a bra on the outside of her clothing.

=== The 2010s and 2020s ===
In the late 2010s and early 2020s, bralettes and soft bras started gaining in popularity, to the detriment of underwired and padded bras. At the same time, the popularity of brands like Victoria's Secret decreased significantly. In 2017, the sales of cleavage-boosting bras fell by 45%, while at Marks & Spencer, wireless bras sales grew by 40%. Some have attributed the rising popularity of bralettes to a new focus on the "athletic body, health and wellbeing" rather than "the male gaze", while others suggest a connection to the #MeToo movement.

Bralettes have also become popular during the COVID-19 lockdowns due to a focus on comfort while working from home. Sport bra sales increased 32% during the pandemic, while bralettes and wireless bras were up 5%.

== No-bra movement ==
=== Second-wave feminism ===
In 1968, protestors at the Miss America protest symbolically threw several feminine products into a "Freedom Trash Can". It was reported that bras were included, which the protestors called "instruments of female torture”. A local newspaper story reported that bras and other lingerie were burned at least briefly that day, noting, "As the bras, girdles, falsies, curlers, and copies of popular women’s magazines burned in the Freedom Trash Can, the demonstration reached the pinnacle of ridicule when the participants paraded a small lamb wearing a gold banner worded Miss America." However, feminist participants later said that no one burned a bra, nor did anyone take off her bra.

Female reporter Lindsy Van Gelder who covered the protest drew an analogy between the feminist protesters and Vietnam War protesters who burned their draft cards. The parallel between protesters burning their draft cards and women burning their bras was encouraged by some organizers, including Robin Morgan. "The media picked up on the bra part," Carol Hanisch said later. "I often say that if they had called us 'girdle burners,' every woman in America would have run to join us." Feminism and "bra-burning" became linked in popular culture. The analogous term "jockstrap-burning" has since been coined as a reference to masculism. While the protesters stated that they did not burn bras that day, some stopped wearing them in protest.

Author and feminist Bonnie J. Dow has suggested that the association between feminism and bra-burning was encouraged by individuals who opposed the feminist movement. "Bra-burning" created an image that women were not seeking freedom from sexism but attempting to assert themselves as sexual beings. Some saw the bra burning women as law-breaking radicals, eager to shock the public. Some feminist activists believe that anti-feminists use the bra-burning myth and the subject of going braless to trivialize what the protesters were trying to accomplish at the 1968 Miss America protest and the feminist movement in general.

Germaine Greer's book The Female Eunuch (1970) became associated with the anti-bra movement because she pointed out how restrictive and uncomfortable a bra could be. She wrote, "Bras are a ludicrous invention but if you make bralessness a rule, you're just subjecting yourself to yet another repression." In 1984, feminist Susan Brownmiller took the position in her book Femininity that women without bras shock and anger men because men "implicitly think that they own breasts and that only they should remove bras."

=== Third-wave feminism ===
In 2005, feminist author Iris Marion Young wrote that the bra "serves as a barrier to touch" and that a braless woman is "deobjectified", eliminating the "hard, pointy look that phallic culture posits as the norm." Without a bra, in her view, women's breasts are not consistently shaped objects but change as the woman moves, reflecting the natural body. Young also believes that training bras are used to indoctrinate girls into thinking about their breasts as sexual objects and to accentuate their sexuality. In 2007, Young wrote that women are subjected to "capitalist, patriarchal American media-dominated culture [that] objectifies breasts before such a distancing glance that freezes and masters." Academic Wendy Burns-Ardolino wrote in 2007 that women's decision to wear bras is mediated by the "male gaze of course the problem with this is most men would like looking at women’s breasts leading them to be objectified again.".

== Asian equivalents ==
While the modern era has evolved almost directly from the proto-bra of the Middle Ages in Europe, Asian cultures have invented garments that serve similar purposes.

=== China ===
Over its long history, China has produced many types of women's undergarments that serve congruent purposes to those of the European bra and corset. The most well-known example is the dudou (Chinese: 肚兜, 兜肚, or 兜兜; also known by other names), a diamond-shaped garment used to flatten the breasts and preserve the stomach qi, which was developed in the Qing dynasty. Other similar items of clothing include:

- above (抱腹) from the Han dynasty
- liangdang (裲襠) from the Wei Jin period
- hezi (诃子) from the Tang dynasty
- moxiong (抹胸) from the Song dynasty
- hehuanjin (合欢襟) from the Yuan dynasty
- zhuyao (主腰) from the Ming dynasty

The dudou was popular among noblewomen in the Ming Dynasty and was also common in the Qing Dynasty.

=== India ===
The first historical reference to breast-support garments in India is found during the rule of King Harshavardhana (1st century CE). Sewn bras and blouses were very much in vogue during the Vijayanagara Empire and the cities brimmed with tailors who specialized in the tight fitting of these garments. The half-sleeved tight bodice or kanchuka figures prominently in the literature of the period, especially Basavapurana (1237 CE), which says kanchukas were worn by young girls as well.

=== Vietnam ===
The yếm is a traditional Vietnamese bodice that evolved from the Chinese dudou. It was worn by women from all classes with a skirt called váy đụp. Although the yếm's popularity died out in the 20th century due to Westernization, it has recently seen a revitalization and found its use in artistic performances.

== See also ==
- Bra
- List of bra designs
- Undergarment
- Wonderbra
