= Bralessness =

Movement consisting of not wearing a bra

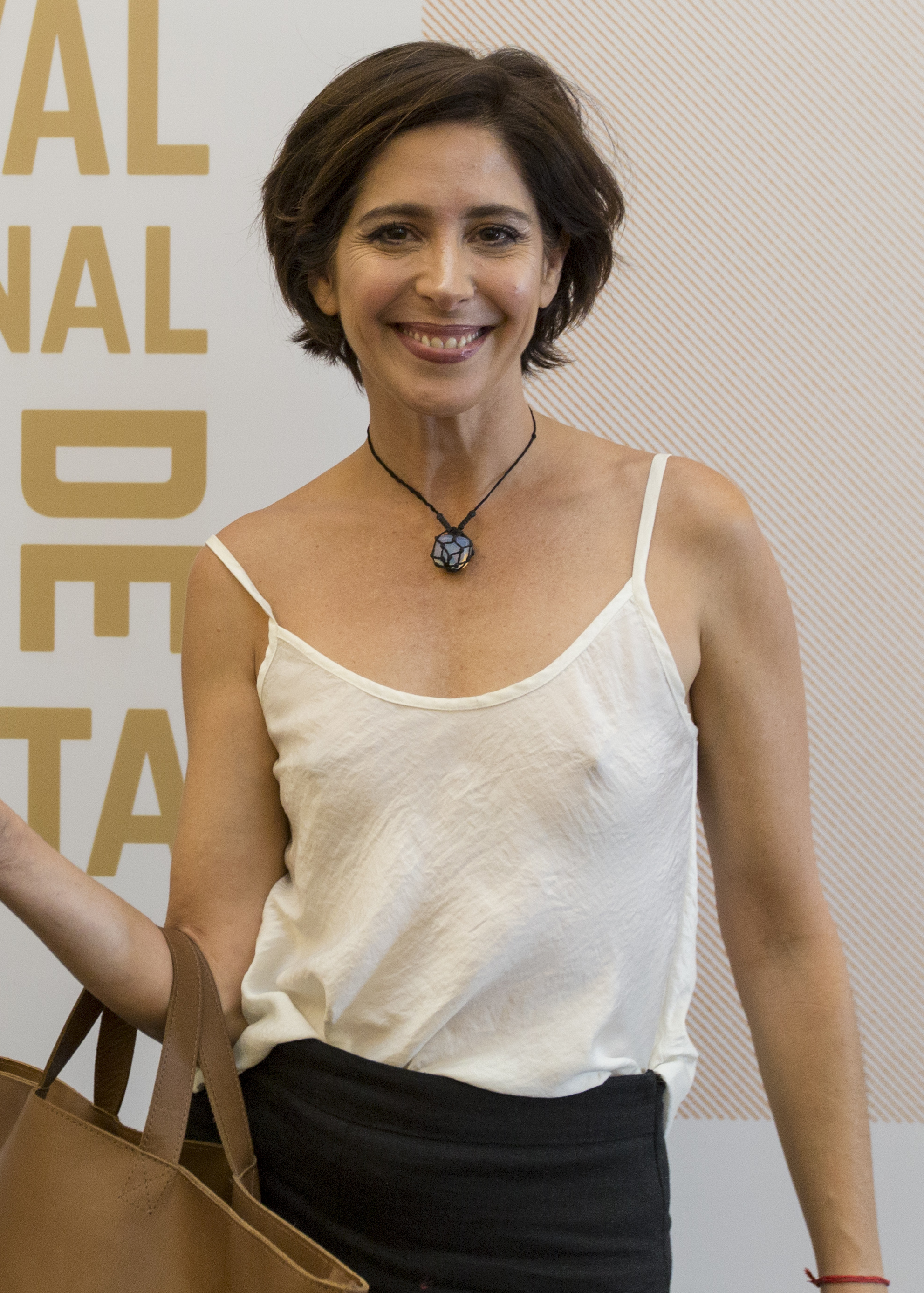
Argentine actress Laura Novoa wearing a top without a bra

Bralessness is the state of not wearing a brassiere as part of a woman's underwear. Women may choose to not wear a bra due to discomfort, health-related issues, their cost, or for social and cultural reasons.

As of 2006, about 10% of Australian women did not wear a bra. Surveys have reported that 5–25% of Western women do not wear a bra.

== Terminology ==
The word braless was first used circa 1965. Other terms for going braless include breast freedom, top freedom, and bra freedom. Activists advocating going braless have referred to protests as a "bra-cott".

== In feminism ==
In the Western world, since the 1960s, there has been a trend towards bralessness among a number of women, especially millennials, who have expressed opposition to and are giving up wearing bras. In 2016, Allure magazine fashion director Rachael Wang wrote, "Going braless is as old as feminism, but it seems to be bubbling to the surface more recently as a direct response to Third Wave moments like #freethenipple hashtag campaign, increased trans-visibility like Caitlyn Jenner's Vanity Fair cover ... and Lena Dunham's show Girls."

A feminist protest at the 1968 Miss America contest is often seen as the beginning of the anti-bra movement, prompting manufacturers to market new designs that created a softer, more natural look.

== Effect on health and breast morphology ==
=== Health impact of wearing tight fitting bras ===
Studies have indicated sports bras which are overly tight may restrict respiratory function.

Because finding a well-fitting bra is difficult, women who wear bras sometimes feel constricted. One study found that 70% of women wear bras that are too small. Sekhon says that bras can impede blood flow to back and chest muscles, contributing to sore back muscles. Women with large breasts who stop wearing a bra may experience improved blood flow more quickly than women with smaller breasts, as bras supporting larger breasts tend to fit tighter than those worn by women with smaller breasts.

=== Orthopedic effects ===
According to a study published in the Clinical Study of Pain, large-breasted women can reduce back pain by going braless, and they may find going braless as a preferred treatment instead of reduction with a mammaplasty.

== Comfort ==
Women with large breasts feel increased comfort compared to women with smaller breasts. Some women who have gone braless while working from home during the COVID-19 pandemic do not want to go back to wearing bras again.

=== Braless at home ===
Upon returning home from a day at work, many women report one of the things they look forward to is taking off their bra as soon as they get home. One editor wrote, "Taking your bra off is an extremely liberating feeling, and one we females look forward to—every day, all day long." During the COVID-19 pandemic and the subsequent requirement for remote work, many women publicly admitted to forgoing wearing a bra at all times.

Miami fashion blogger Maria Tettamanti gladly confessed that while working from home she is braless. "The only positive attribute coming out of this pandemic is the notion we can work from home braless – free of wires, overly snug, overly padded bras."

During April 2020, online bra sales dropped 12%. Women welcomed the chance to avoid the normal discomfort that often accompanies wearing a bra. One clothing manufacturer surveyed 1000 women and found that 35% of women were braless while working from home. They also reported that hashtags like #nobranoproblem and #bralessandflawless were common on Twitter.

== Misconceptions ==
=== Cancer fears ===
Some women choose not to wear bras because they worry that it might increase the risk of breast cancer. This idea was promoted in a controversial 1995 book Dressed to Kill: The Link Between Breast Cancer and Bras. A 2002 survey found that 6% of women agreed that "Under-wire bras can cause breast cancer", 63% disagreed with this claim, and another 31% did not know.

There is no credible scientific evidence that wearing bras causes cancer. The United States National Cancer Institute states that bras have not been found to increase a woman's risk for breast cancer, and the American Cancer Society stated, "There are no scientifically valid studies that show wearing bras of any type causes breast cancer."

Misinformation about bras and cancer spread across the internet "mostly inspired by one study with several scientific flaws...The study, never published in a peer-reviewed journal, did not adjust for known breast cancer risk factors that might be associated with bra-wearing behavior, like weight and age. Also, study participants knew the hypothesis before taking the survey." A well-regarded 2014 study by researchers at the Fred Hutchinson Cancer Research Center in Seattle found no direct link between wearing a bra and developing breast cancer. The report noted, "no aspect of bra wearing, including bra cup size, recency, average number of hours a day worn, wearing a bra with an underwire, or age first began regularly wearing a bra, was associated with risks" of breast cancer. The study included detailed studies of women's lifestyle and bra-wearing habits and found no correlation between bra use and cancer.

=== Breast sagging ===
A common misconception is that bras are required to keep breasts from sagging later in life. There is no relationship between wearing a bra and whether breasts sag. Wearing a bra for any amount of time does not arrest, slow, or in any way affect breast ptosis. John Dixey, former CEO of bra-maker Playtex, explained on a British TV Channel 4 interview, "We have evidence that wearing a bra could not prevent sagging, because the breast itself is not muscle, so keeping it toned up is an impossibility. ... There's no permanent effect on the breast from wearing a particular bra. The bra will give you the shape the bra's been designed to give while you're wearing it."

== Social issues ==
Modern women have been socialized to believe that perky breasts are desirable. Laura Tempesta, bra expert and founder of bra manufacturer Bravolution, stated, "Lifted breasts are considered attractive in our culture which is why bra-wearing is a cultural development." Women feel pressured to wear bras because society expects their breasts to "stay firm and in the right position", or that if they are braless, it means she is promiscuous, loose, or slutty. An increasing number of millennial women reject these ideas as holdovers from earlier eras when a "woman's existence is for the male gaze."

An increasing number of women, especially those among the millennial generation, feel more comfortable about not wearing a bra, and what they wear is based more on what they want and not due to social norms or feminist ideology. With the increasing acceptance of the Me Too movement, co-workers and others have finally realized that they do not have the right to say anything about a woman who chooses not to wear a bra. Jennifer Maher, a gender studies professor at Indiana University, says wearing or not wearing a bra is no longer "a feminist tenet".

=== Feminist reaction ===
During the 1960s, a few feminists embraced bralessness. However, most Western women continued to wear bras, despite complaining about how uncomfortable they were.

In 1968 at the feminist Miss America protest, protesters symbolically threw a number of feminine products into a "Freedom Trash Can". These included bras, which were among items the protesters called "instruments of female torture" and accouterments of what they perceived to be enforced femininity. A local news story in the Atlantic City Press reported that "the bras, girdles, falsies, curlers, and copies of popular women's magazines burned in the 'Freedom Trash Can'". But individuals who were present said that no one burned a bra nor did anyone take off her bra. Reporter Lindsy Van Gelder drew an analogy between the feminist protesters and Vietnam War protesters who burned their draft cards, and this parallel between protesters burning their draft cards and women burning their bras was encouraged by some organizers including Robin Morgan. "The media picked up on the bra part", Carol Hanisch said later. "I often say that if they had called us 'girdle burners,' every woman in America would have run to join us."

Feminism and "bra-burning" became linked in popular culture. While feminist women may or may not literally have burned their bras that day, some stopped wearing them in protest. Feminist author Bonnie J. Dow suggested that the association between feminism and bra-burning was encouraged by individuals who opposed the feminist movement. "Bra-burning" created an image that women were not really seeking freedom from sexism, but were attempting to assert themselves as sexual beings. This might lead individuals to believe, as Susan J. Douglas wrote, that the women were merely trying to be "trendy, and to attract men". Some feminist activists believe that anti-feminists use the bra burning myth and the subject of going braless to trivialize what the protesters were trying to accomplish at the feminist 1968 Miss America protest and the feminist movement in general.

The trope of feminists burning their bras was anticipated by an earlier generation of feminists who called for burning corsets as a step toward liberation. In 1873 Elizabeth Stuart Phelps Ward wrote:

So burn up the corsets! ... No, nor do you save the whalebones, you will never need whalebones again. Make a bonfire of the cruel steels that have lorded it over your thorax and abdomens for so many years and heave a sigh of relief, for your emancipation I assure you, from this moment has begun.

Some feminists began arguing in the 1960s and 1970s that the bra was an example of how women's clothing shaped and even deformed women's bodies to male expectations. Professor Lisa Jardine listened to feminist Germaine Greer talk about bras during a formal college dinner in Newnham College, Cambridge, in 1964 (Greer had become a member of the college faculty in 1962):

At the graduates' table, Germaine was explaining that there could be no liberation for women, no matter how highly educated, as long as we were required to cram our breasts into bras constructed like mini-Vesuviuses, two stitched white cantilevered cones which bore no resemblance to the female anatomy. The willingly suffered discomfort of the Sixties bra, she opined vigorously, was a hideous symbol of female oppression.

Greer's book The Female Eunuch (1970) became associated with the anti-bra movement because she pointed out how restrictive and uncomfortable a bra could be. "Bras are a ludicrous invention", she wrote, "but if you make bralessness a rule, you're just subjecting yourself to yet another repression."

Susan Brownmiller in her book Femininity (1984) took the position that women without bras shock and anger men because men "implicitly think that they own breasts and that only they should remove bras."

Feminist author Iris Marion Young wrote in 2005 that the bra "serves as a barrier to touch" and that a braless woman is "deobjectified", eliminating the "hard, pointy look that phallic culture posits as the norm." Without a bra, in her view, women's breasts are not consistently shaped objects but change as the woman moves, reflecting the natural body. Young also argued that training bras are used to indoctrinate girls into thinking about their breasts as sexual objects and to accentuate their sexuality. She wrote in 2007 that, in American culture, breasts are subject to "[c]apitalist, patriarchal American media-dominated culture [that] objectifies breasts before such a distancing glance that freezes and masters." Academic Wendy Burns-Ardolino wrote in 2007 that women's decision to wear bras is mediated by the "male gaze".

In March, 2017, actress Emma Watson was braless in a Vanity Fair photo shoot. She was criticized by some who thought she was a hypocrite for supporting feminism and showing some skin. She responded, "Feminism is about giving women a choice; feminism is not a stick with which to beat other women with. It's about freedom, it's about liberation, it's about equality. I really don't know what my tits have to do with it."

=== Bralessness as a form of protest ===
In the 1960s, some hippie women went braless to make political statements about sexual liberation or their relationship with nature and their bodies. In 1966, during the height of the hippie era in San Francisco, two women students at San Francisco State College protested a proposed law that would require women to wear bras by walking topless near the campus. On August 1, 1969, an Anti-Bra Day was declared in San Francisco to protest societal pressure to wear constrictive, feminine garments. The protest drew large crowds, blocking traffic, and a few women took their bras off from under their clothing in the Financial District.

=== Bralessness as a fashion ===
In 1968, shortly after the feminist protest against bras and other feminine products at the Miss America pageant, actress Marlo Thomas began going braless on the prime-time television series That Girl. "God created women to bounce, so be it." Thomas said in an interview in Good Housekeeping magazine. "If I bounce, I'm glad to be a girl." On August 5, 1970, the New York Times wrote that "the braless look has established a beachhead in Manhattan. ... Generally speaking, the braless woman is under 30 and small-breasted. But grandmothers are also among the throngs, as are C and D cuppers—who get the most comment, both pro and con, from male oglers."

In 1971, activist and actress Bianca Jagger broke tradition and wore a tailored Yves St. Laurent Le Smoking jacket to her Catholic wedding with nothing underneath. Singer, songwriter, model, and actress Debbie Harry was well known for going braless during the 1970s. Model and actress Jerry Hall set an example during the same period when she was frequently photographed braless and featured in fashion magazines.

French journalist, writer and social influencer Sabina Socol is known for never wearing a bra. She attributes it to discomfort.

I realized at a very young age, as a teenager, that bras are uncomfortable, at least for me. I don't like it when you can see them through T-shirts. I don't care at all if we can see my nipples or the shape of my breasts. We all have them. I don't think it's offensive.

The young female characters on Lena Dunham's controversial HBO show Girls (2012–2017) were often without bras."

An increasing number of women question previously accepted medical, physiological, anatomical, and social reasons for wearing bras. They recognize that they wear bras for psychological, aesthetic, or practical reasons. An informal movement advocates breast freedom, top freedom, bra freedom, or simply going braless. There are a large number of magazine articles and YouTube videos in which women describe their motives and offer guidance on how to go braless. Poet Savannah Brown of London published a YouTube video, "sav's guide to going braless", which has nearly one million views.

=== Religious issues ===
In 2009 Somalia's hard-line Islamic group Al-Shabaab forced women to shake their breasts at gunpoint to see if they were wearing bras, which they called "un-Islamic". A resident of Mogadishu whose daughters were whipped said, "The Islamists say a woman's chest should be firm naturally, or flat."

=== Free the Nipple campaign ===
Women took part in the Free the Nipple campaign after a movie of that name was made in 2015. They protested the legal prohibitions and cultural taboos attached to exposing female breasts in places where it is legal for men to be topless. The Free the Nipple campaign was sparked in part due to double standards and the censorship of women's bodies on social media. Its advocates believe that women's nipples should be legally and culturally acceptable.

In many Western countries, women used social media to show their support of the right to go topless or without a bra. In Iceland during Free the Nipple day in 2015, some female university students purposefully wore clothing that revealed they were not wearing a bra and a few others chose to go topless for the day. Teen Vogue reported that the Free the Nipple movement may have initially focused on being actually topless, but it has grown to include the idea of going braless under clothes. Women are seeking to free the nipple beneath the outer clothing they wear.

=== No Bra Day ===
No Bra Day, an annual event when women go braless to encourage breast cancer awareness, began in 2013. In 2017, the unofficial day was observed by women in 30 countries, including New Zealand, Romania, Malaysia, Scotland, India, and Ghana. More than 82,000 women posted pictures on Twitter and Instagram using the hashtag #nobraday.

=== Empowerment of women ===
Some media outlets have capitalized on the no bra phenomenon with exploitative stories. The tabloid website TMZ posted an item about "Happy No Bra Day" with an image of Selena Gomez wearing a see-through top. Another site featured a photo gallery titled "#NoBraDay: 15 Celebs Who Frolick About With Their Fun Bags Freed".

Whether a woman wears a bra or not has progressed in some social circles from discussions about appropriate clothing to "the body shaming and sexualizing of women" and a "societal debate on the equality of men and women, as it pertains to their bodies."

One woman commented, "The reason is that I tried being braless, and I liked it better. It wasn't a political decision, except insofar as everything a woman does with her body that isn't letting someone else dictate what she ought to do with it is a political decision."

French journalist Sabina Socol commented, "I never liked wearing bras; I always felt suffocated in them." She grew up in a household where going braless wasn't seen as sexual or taboo. "Even as a woman with breasts, I do what I want with my body. Every human has nipples. There shouldn't be any shame [in showing them], but if you want to hide them, that's okay, too, as long as the choice is yours."

In June 2017, Sarah Starks organized a protest in Charleston, West Virginia, US, in response to the social expectation that women and girls must wear bras and shirts to avoid offending or arousing others. "It's sexual because people say it is", she added. A West Virginia University professor of social work commented that "if other people are made uncomfortable by it, that's cultural and that's social". Starks commented that breasts are "like this separate, sexual part of us, and if you want to be taken seriously as a woman, cover them up." The protest's purpose was to show that nipples and breasts are not sexual objects. Some of the marchers went braless, others topless, and others fully clothed.

=== Opposition to training bras ===
In Western culture, the bra is sometimes viewed as an icon of popular culture, and purchasing a girl's first bra is seen by some as a long-awaited rite of passage into womanhood, signifying her coming of age. The age at which girls first wear bras is sometimes controversial. Within Western cultures that place great value upon youth, bras are marketed to women of all ages by emphasizing their ability to preserve a youthful appearance.

Young girls may begin to develop breasts as early as age 9 or as late as 18. The early stage of breast development is known as "breast budding" and is measured on the Tanner scale. Some believe that girls who are developing breasts may be self-conscious and desire a bra to conceal their emerging breasts and for psychological comfort. A girl developing breasts has no physical need for support, so training bras serve only social and psychological purposes. Bras of all kinds are often designed and marketed for fashionable rather than functional purposes. The training bra is marketed to help young girls become accustomed to wearing lingerie.

Critics of training bras say companies are appealing to very young girls' desire to feel more sexy and attractive. The opponents believe that manufacturers market training bras as a way to sexualize young girls and indoctrinate them into thinking about their breasts as sexual objects. The critics believe that businesses benefit financially by encouraging precocious sexuality in girls and exploiting their fears about self-image and social norms.

== Legal issues ==
The number and variety of legal issues faced by women about whether to wear a bra or not illustrates the depth and complexity of the subject in society.

=== Security issues ===
In 2014 the right of jail inmates to choose bralessness was affirmed in the province of Ontario, Canada. In 2016, the Chatham-Kent Police Service in Ontario came under criticism for requiring a woman held in custody to remove her bra before a breathalyzer test. The police stated that they required women in custody to give up any item which could be used as "ligatures for self-harm or strangulation" – including necklaces, ties, shoelaces and bras. According to her lawyer, the woman didn't normally go braless in public and was "terrified and upset" by this requirement. The police service subsequently amended its policy of requiring women to remove their bras while in police custody from a blanket policy to a case-by-case basis.

In a similar case in Osaka during 2017, a female defendant was forbidden from wearing a bra while in custody. Although police rules allow women to request a bra for a court appearance, her request was denied. Her attorneys filed a complaint with the Osaka Bar Association, claiming that denying the woman's right to wear a bra was a "breach of human rights".

=== Workplace dress codes ===
Some employers continue to require women to wear bras. Relevant laws governing workplace dress codes may enable employers to instill coverage requirements that differ between genders, however in New York state, human rights law prevents employers from "applying grooming or appearance standards that impose different requirements for people based on gender."

In January 2011, a German court ruled that employers can require female employees to wear bras or undershirts at work. The case involved an airport security firm defending the essentiality of bras, as part of the dress code, in order to "preserve the orderly appearance of employer-provided uniforms." The case enabled employers and companies in Germany to require their female employees to wear brassiere and to dismiss female employees who do not comply.

=== Academic dress codes ===
School dress codes are increasingly contested by students who resist rules that are supported by weight or gender discrimination. Bras are a focal point among students who think the codes have become too invasive.

After a bad sunburn, 17-year-old American high school student Lizzy Martinez wore a boy's loose, oversized, long-sleeve, crew-neck T-shirt without a bra to school in April 2017. Called out of class to the dean's office, Martinez was told she was in violation of the School District of Manatee County's dress code (although the district's dress code did not require females to wear a bra) and was causing a "distraction," stating that boys were "looking and laughing.” Notifying them of her sunburn, she was required to wear an additional shirt and due to the continued visibility of her nipples through her T-shirt was told by the dean to obtain adhesive bandages from the school's clinic in order to cover them. The American Civil Liberties Union wrote a letter to the school district protesting what they described as their discriminatory enforcement of the school's dress code. Martinez continued to refuse to wear a bra to school, stating, "I was wearing a shirt given to me by a male friend and I'm 100 percent sure he wasn't wearing a bra the countless times he wore it to school." Martinez went on to comment on the discriminatory and victim-blaming nature of the code, stating that "If the boys in my class were so distracted, shouldn't they have been talked to and educated about the situation and not me being pulled out of class?" She organized a "bracott" two weeks later during which she encouraged female students to attend school without a bra, or to wear a shirt with a supportive message. During the protest, about 30 female students did not wear bras, and several students marked their backpacks with adhesive bandages in the shape of an X. University of Richmond law professor Meredith Harbach, who has written about sexualization and public school dress codes, said that the school was "foisting this notion that unrestrained breasts are sexual and likely to cause disruption and distract other students."

In Montana, senior Kaitlyn Juvik at Helena high school was reprimanded on May 25, 2016, for wearing an off-the-shoulder black top without a bra, being told that she was causing male students and staff to feel "uncomfortable". The school handbook does not require bras, but forbids students from showing a bra strap. The principal insisted the issue was not about whether she wore a bra, but her dress that made others uncomfortable and prompted him to ask her to "cover-up". A friend of hers created a Facebook group named "No Bra, No Problem" about the issue, which quickly attracted over 1,200 members. About 300 fellow students joined her in protesting her treatment by attending school on May 27 without a bra. Several male students wore bras outside their shirts to support the protest. The incident drew international attention due to the school's reaction and her protest. Juvik stated that the issue of women wearing or not wearing a bra is larger than whether a woman wears an article of clothing. She told People that it's about "the body shaming and sexualizing of women". "Wearing a bra is a personal choice. It's my body. Why is it anybody else's business whether I'm wearing a bra, especially when I'm covered up and dressed appropriately?"

In Quebec, Canada, the Facebook group “Les Carrés Jaunes” was launched by four students at Joseph-François-Perrault High School against the “restrictive and sexist" school dress code. During March 2018 the group organised a protest which saw the students wear yellow squares on their clothing to protest this “archaic” code and demand the right to go without bras. One of the organisers, Célestine Uhde, wrote that bras can be uncomfortable. The students "launched the movement to fight the culture of rape and hypersexualization. We want the equality of men and women both in our treatment and how the world views our bodies." She said, "We as women shouldn't be put down because of our bodies."

=== Public dress codes ===
In July 2019, a woman was arrested in Iran for not wearing a bra, her actions potentially “[arousing] men”. Within Iran the Guidance Patrol (Gasht-e Ershad) act as undercover agents who implement, enforce, and uphold state interpretations and expectations of morality, including rules of dress. Supported by Basij militia and established by the Iranian judiciary and police, the Guidance Patrol hold a primary focus on enforcing the observance of hijab, with all Iranian women (including tourists) required to uphold the coverage rules underpinned by religious conservatism. The arrested woman, Narges, was moved into a van by three women of the Guidance Patrol after they noticed her bralessness soon after she stepped out of the metro station. She claimed that due to medication utilised to treat an acute fibrocystic disease her skin and breasts had become sensitive and painful, further justifying her position in stating that, “I do not wear bras at home, at work or even at parties.” For her release, Narges was coerced into signing a pledge declaring that she would not repeat the action.

== In popular culture ==
Prior to strict enforcement of the Hays Code in mid-1934, actress Carole Lombard was always braless, as was Jean Harlow. Many pre-code movies were characterized by sexual energy, including scenes of women obviously braless. After the code was enforced, bralessness was not shown in film again until the 1960s.

Notable instances of women going braless in popular culture include:

- Clara Bow plays Nasa "Dynamite" Springer in the 1932 pre-code film Call Her Savage. Wearing a white blouse, she is braless in multiple scenes.
- In April 1957, Italian actress Sophia Loren was being welcomed to Hollywood by Paramount Pictures at a dinner party at Romanoff's restaurant in Beverly Hills. American actress Jayne Mansfield was seated at a table between Loren and Clifton Webb. Braless and wearing a deeply plunging neckline, Mansfield at one point purposefully stood up and leaned forward, exposing her breasts and her left nipple. Photographer Delmar Watson captured Loren staring at Mansfield's breasts, and Joe Shere caught Loren looking side-eye at Mansfield's bust. Both pictures went viral, receiving world-wide attention.
- The success of the television show Charlie's Angels was sometimes attributed to the scanty or provocative clothing frequently worn by the female stars. Actress Farrah Fawcett once said the TV show's success was due to what critics described as "Jiggle TV". She said, "When the show was number three, I figured it was our acting. When it got to be number one, I decided it could only be because none of us wears a bra."
- Director George Lucas required actress Carrie Fisher to forego wearing a bra during filming of Star Wars. He told her, "There's no underwear in space." He later explained to her that human bodies expand in space, and that her bra might have strangled her. She replied sarcastically, "Really? Now I understand it."

== See also ==
- Going commando
- History of bras
- Toplessness
