= No Bra Day =

Annual day for breast cancer awareness

- No Bra Day October 13
- Date: October 13 (during National Breast Cancer Awareness Month)
- Frequency: Annual
- Location: World-wide
- Established: July 9, 2011

No Bra Day is an annual observance on October 13 on which women are encouraged to go braless as a means to encourage breast cancer awareness. No Bra Day was initially observed on July 9, 2011, but within three years it had moved to the 13th day of the National Breast Cancer Awareness Month, October. Users on social media are encouraged to post using the hashtag #nobraday to promote awareness of breast cancer symptoms and to encourage gender equality. Some users on social media sites also encourage women to post pictures of themselves not wearing a bra. Some women embrace No Bra Day as a political statement while others prefer the comfort of discarding what they view as a restrictive, uncomfortable garment.

The observance has spread worldwide. The event was spun off a medical event in Toronto, Canada, that encourages breast cancer survivors to consider reconstructive surgery. First held on October 19, 2011, the medical event was named BRA (Breast Reconstruction Awareness) Day. It was adapted by an anonymous individual who conceived of No Bra Day as a way to encourage women to enjoy being braless and to become knowledgeable about breast cancer symptoms. The day is controversial as some see it as sexualizing and exploiting women's bodies while at the same time belittling a serious disease.

== History ==
=== Event origins ===
The original event known as "BRA Day" was started by Toronto plastic surgeon Dr. Mitchell Brown. The first BRA Day event, titled "Breast Reconstruction – An Evening of Learning and Sharing", was held in Toronto, Canada at Women's College Hospital and Toronto General Hospital on October 19, 2011. Brown found that many Canadian women who underwent a mastectomy due to breast cancer resisted undergoing reconstructive surgery. He founded "Breast Reconstruction Awareness" (BRA) Day to increase women's awareness of the availability of reconstructive breast surgery. BRA day is intended to raise awareness of breast cancer screening, alert women to breast cancer symptoms, and to encourage women to conduct regular self examinations. The event was adopted in the U.S. in 2012.

As of September 2018, the BRA Day event devoted to educating women about reconstructive surgery, and hosted by the Canadian Cancer Society, continued to be held across Canada. BRA day is observed on different dates in different provinces of Canada during the month of October.

The origin of No Bra Day can be traced back to the first BRA Day held in Toronto, in 2011. In July that year, an anonymous individual using the name Anastasia Doughnuts conceived of No Bra Day and published the first website promoting the event.

=== Beginnings in social media ===
The first No Bra Day event was created by an anonymous internet user self-named "Anastasia Doughnuts" for July 9, 2011 and was observed on that date through 2013. In 2013 and 2014, social media posts announced both July 9 and October 13 as No Bra Day. Since 2015, the event has only been promoted on October 13. The event was initially described, in part, as:

Boobies are Fantastic… We all think so. And what better way to express the way we feel than to support a full day of boobie freedom?? ...
Women are magnificent creatures, and so are their breasts. Let us spend the day unleashing boobies from their boobie zoos.

**Breast Cancer is something you should take seriously and be checked for.**

The announcement was later reposted on a Facebook group named "No Bra, No Problem" which grew to over 1,200 members. The group was started by teenager Brooke Lanie of Montana. She was responding to her Helena, Montana high school principal's treatment of her friend Kaitlyn Juvik, who was summoned to the office because her bralessness had "disturbed" a male teacher.

October is National Breast Cancer Awareness Month, and by 2014 the official day of the event was moved to October 13, during which women are urged to forgo wearing a bra. An increasing number of women, especially millennials, have expressed opposition to and are giving up wearing bras.

== Response ==
=== Participation ===
In 2012, about 400,000 individuals took part in No Bra Day, 250,000 of those on Facebook. As of 2017 the day was observed by women in countries including New Zealand, Romania, Malaysia, Scotland, India, Ghana and the Netherlands. Women are urged after taking off their bra to give themselves a breast exam. On social media, women are encouraged to go braless and to post photos using the hashtag #nobraday. More than 82,000 women posted pictures on Twitter and Instagram in 2017. Women who choose not to go braless and men are encouraged to wear something purple on that day. Some sites suggest that participants donate to breast cancer charities. A Romanian photographer capitalized on the idea and published an album of photos depicting braless women.

=== Feminist connection ===
Some feminists who support the idea of using No Bra Day to raise awareness of breast cancer are concerned with the sexualization of the #nobraday hashtag in social media. In the Philippines, the observance is seen as a day to advance the cause of gender equality. One journalist noted that No Bra Day "asserts femininity and our appreciation of who we are as a woman... The bra symbolizes how women are being held in bondage".

== Criticism ==
=== No official sponsorship ===
The unofficial No Bra Day is not recognized by any cancer research organization and is not a formal part of National Breast Cancer Awareness Month. The event does not directly raise money for cancer research or prevention, although individuals are in some cases encouraged to support such causes.

=== Sexualization ===
The association between going braless and breast cancer screening has drawn criticism.

The tabloid website TMZ posted an item about "Happy No Bra Day" with an image of Selena Gomez wearing a see-through top. Another site featured a photo gallery titled "#NoBraDay: 15 Celebs Who Frolick About With Their Fun Bags Freed". One of the issues with the concept is that breast cancer survivors who use prosthetics must wear a bra to conceal their disfigurement or wear prosthetics and inserts in their bra to make them appear "normal". Some critics have described the event as sexualizing and exploiting women's bodies while at the same time belittling a serious disease.

Jean Sachs, CEO of Living Beyond Breast Cancer, thinks No Bra Day is offensive. "I mean breast cancer is a life-threatening illness. It has nothing to do with wearing a bra or not wearing a bra." Gayle Sulik, founder and executive director of the Breast Cancer Consortium, said, "But we don't really pay attention to what's going on with breast cancer. That's a hugely damaging impact of this sort of message".
