= Polly Smith (inventor) =

American designer and inventor (b. 1949)

- Born: November 10, 1949 (age 76); Montclair, New Jersey, U.S.
- Other name: Polly Palmer–Smith
- Education: Moore College of Art and Design; New York University
- Occupations: Inventor, costume designer
- Employer: The Jim Henson Company
- Awards: Emmy award, BAFTA (1989), National Inventors Hall of Fame (2022)

Polly Smith (born November 10, 1949) is an American inventor and costume designer. Smith was the costume designer for The Muppet Show and Sesame Street.

In 1977, Smith co-created the "Jogbra", the first sports bra, working alongside Lisa Lindahl and Hinda Miller. She was inducted into the National Inventors Hall of Fame in 2022.

== Early life and education ==
Polly Palmer Smith was born November 10, 1949, in Montclair, New Jersey. Smith attended Montclair Kimberley Academy. Her mother made quilts and her grandfather was an illustrator.

She earned a Bachelor of Fine Arts (1971) in fashion design at the Moore College of Art and Design, and a master's degree (1975) in costume design at New York University.

== Career ==
In 1977, Smith was working with Lisa Lindahl on costumes for the William Shakespeare festival in Burlington, Vermont. Lindahl was a keen athlete, and experienced discomfort when running in a regular bra. Together they came up with the design for a sports bra, and worked with Hinda Miller to source the materials and conduct a test run. When Smith visited New York for work, she returned with new fabrics – elastics and Lycra – and created a bra for Lindahl's measurements. Lindahl and Miller co-founded Jogbra, Inc.

In 1978, Smith joined The Jim Henson Company. She was a costume designer on The Muppet Show and Sesame Street. Her design for Miss Piggy was featured in an exhibition on Women Designers in the USA. She received 7 Emmy Awards for her work on Sesame Street. During the final season of The Muppet Show, Smith would design fifteen to twenty costumes each week. “There wasn’t time to sketch at all,” Smith explained. "There was one other woman there sewing and we pretty much had to talk it through."

In 1989, she won a British Academy of Film and Television Arts (BAFTA) award for her costume work on the television series The StoryTeller.

When asked about their contributions to the design of the sports bra, Smith commented, “Lisa was the idea, I was the fabrication, and Hinda was the driving force behind making it happen. And this is one of the things we all agreed on — [that] it couldn’t have happened if one of us had been missing — because it needed all three.”
