= Lisa Lindahl =

American entrepreneur and inventor (b. 1948)

- Born: Eugénie Louise Zobian; November 23, 1948 (age 77); Montclair N.J., U.S.
- Other names: Lisa Zobian, Lisa Zobian-Lindahl
- Education: Vernon Court Junior College, Katherine Gibbs Secretarial School
- Alma mater: University of Vermont, Holy Names University
- Occupations: Writer, entrepreneur, artist, activist, inventor
- Known for: Inventing and designing the first sports bra for women
- Awards: National Inventors Hall of Fame

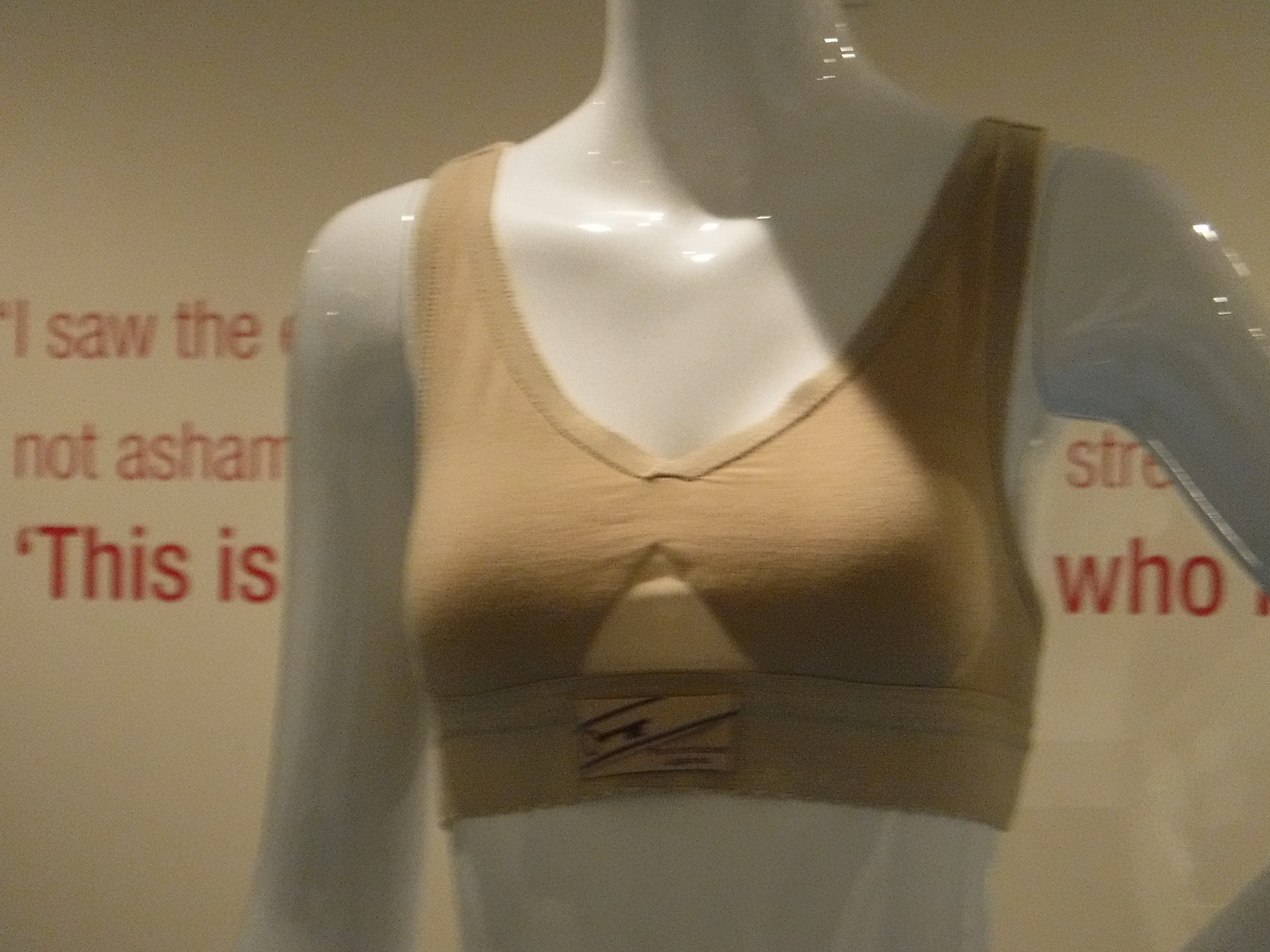
Jogbra

Lisa Lindahl (née Eugénie Louise Zobian; born November 23, 1948) is an American entrepreneur, writer, and inventor. In 1977, Lisa Lindahl co-created the "Jogbra", the first sports bra, working alongside Hinda Miller and Polly Smith. She was inducted into the National Inventors Hall of Fame in 2022.

Lindahl was also involved with the Epilepsy Foundation, where she spent nine years on the board, taught others about the cause, and raised money and awareness. She resides between Charleston, South Carolina and Colchester, Vermont.

== Biography ==
Lindahl was born in [Montclair, New Jersey in 1948. She grew up in Montclair, New Jersey and attended Montclair Kimberly Academy, together with Polly Smith.

She received a bachelor's degree in education from the University of Vermont in 1977. Previously she graduated from Vernon Court Junior College in Newport, Rhode Island, and the Katharine Gibbs Secretarial School in Montclair, New Jersey.

Later in life Lindahl finished her master's degree in culture and spirituality from Holy Names University in Oakland, California in 2007.

== Jogbra, Inc. ==
Lindahl was in the middle of graduate school, which she put on hold, when she came up with the idea for the jockbra. Lisa called her sister Victoria Woodrow one day to complain about her painful experiences having to just wear a normal bra while running. During the course of Lindahl and theater costume designer Polly Smith's exploration for a better alternative, Victoria suggested that what they needed was a jockstrap for women's breasts. In the costume shop of Royall Tyler Theatre at the University of Vermont, Lindahl and Smith actually sewed two jockstraps together and nicknamed it a "jockbra". Smith's assistant, Hinda Schreiber, also helped with creating the bra. It was later renamed a "jogbra". One of their original Jogbras is bronzed and on display near the costume shop of the theater. Two others are housed by the Smithsonian Institution and another by the New York Metropolitan Museum of Art.

For years Lindahl held the role of president, Chief Executive Officer and chair of the board for selling the invention. Then in 1990 Playtex purchased the invention. After Playtex's purchasing of the company, Lindahl still served as Co-President of the Jogbra.

== Epilepsy Foundation ==
Lisa Lindahl has epilepsy herself, and has made it one of her main goals to educate others on the topic. Lindahl took upon the role of Senior Vice President of the Board of Directors of the Epilepsy Foundation for several years. While holding this position Lindahl created The Women and Epilepsy Health Initiative, which has given opportunities for researchers to study the gender differences in epilepsy. For all her work to help the cause, the Epilepsy Foundation gave Lindahl a National Personal Achievement Award. In 1999, Lindahl was awarded a Congressional Commendation for her work on epilepsy by Vermont Senator James Jeffords.

== Bellisse Compressure Comfort Bra ==
In later years, Lindahl joined with Dr. Lesli Bell to create a form of her previous bra invention that would serve as a compression bra to help breast cancer patients overcome the pain and discomfort associated with procedures. With Lindahl's prior knowledge of designing and entrepreneurship, in 2001 the two ladies invented the Compression Comfort Bra. Along with the creation of the Compression Comfort Bra, Lindahl also worked to educate people about truncal lymphedema, which many women with breast cancer suffer from, and Dr. Bell has continued teaching the public about this issue, and is now a world renowned public speaker on the topic.

== Other work ==
Lindahl has also put her education and practice to good use by teaching a Women's Small Business Program at Trinity College in Burlington, Vermont. Lindahl also taught business at Champlain College and Trinity College.

She served as a Trustee of the Vermont Land Trust, which is an organization devoted to conserving Vermont's landscape. Lindahl as well participated in a support and backing network for entrepreneurs. She was nominated for the "Boss of the Year Award", and "Entrepreneur of the Year award", by the Sporting Goods Manufacturers’ Association, and by Inc. Magazine.

Lindahl was inducted into the National Inventors Hall of Fame in 2022 alongside co-inventors Hinda Miller (formerly Hinda Schreiber) and Polly Smith.

== Present-day ==
Lindahl's 2019 publication is Unleash The Girls, The Untold Story of the Invention of the Sports Bra and How It Changed the World and Me, a business memoir about women in business dealing with success, power issues and personal growth. Her previous book, titled Beauty as Action, the Way of True Beauty and How its Practice can Change our World (2017) is a self-help book for individuals who want to contribute to changing the current societal paradigm.

== Publications ==
- Lindahl, Lisa. Minding Your Business: A Guide Book for Women Entrepreneurs.
- Lindahl, Lisa Z. (2017). Beauty as Action: The Way of True Beauty and How Its Practice Can Change Our World. EZL Enterprises. ISBN 9780998746708.
- Lindahl, Lisa Z. (2019). Unleash the Girls: The Untold Story of the Invention of the Sports Bra and How It Changed the World (And Me). Bublish, Inc. ISBN 9781950282432.
