= Hinda Miller =

Canadian-American Vermont politician and inventor

Member of the Vermont Senate from the Chittenden district
- In office 2002–2013

Personal details
- Born: Hinda Schreiber; 18 April 1950 (age 76) Montreal, Quebec, Canada
- Party: Democratic
- Education: Parsons School of Design (BA); New York University (MA)
- Occupation: Politician, entrepreneur, costume designer, inventor
- Awards: National Inventors Hall of Fame (2022)

Hinda Miller (née Hinda Schreiber; born 18 April 1950) is a Canadian-born American politician, entrepreneur, costume designer, and inventor. She was a member of the Vermont Senate from the Chittenden senate district, from 2002 until 2013. Miller finished second in the 2006 Burlington mayoral election behind Progressive Bob Kiss.

In 1977, Miller co-created the "Jogbra", the first sports bra, working alongside Lisa Lindahl and Polly Smith. She was inducted into the National Inventors Hall of Fame in 2022.

== Biography ==
Hinda Schreiber was born on April 18, 1950, in Montreal, Quebec, Canada. She married Dr. Joel Miller, a psychologist, and they have 2 children.

Miller earned a BA degree from the Parsons School of Design, New York City, in 1972, and a Master of Fine Arts from New York University in 1976. Miller trained as a costume designer and later taught costume design at the University of South Carolina. The Miller family moved to Burlington, Vermont, in 1977. She is Jewish.

== Business career ==
Miller helped develop the first sports bra. The first general exercise bra, initially called a "jockbra", was invented in 1977 by Lisa Lindahl and Polly Smith, with the help of Miller, who was working as Smith's assistant. It was later renamed a “jogbra”. In 1990, Playtex purchased Jogbra from Lindahl and her partners. Hinda Miller, Lisa Lindahl, and Polly Smith were inducted into the National Inventors Hall of Fame in 2022 for their patented sports bra.

She is a co-founder and past president (1984 to May 1994), CEO (May 1994 to January 1996), and vice president of communications (January 1996 to December 1997) of Jogbra, a maker of women's sports apparel now owned by Sara Lee Corp.

She is owner and president of DeForest Concepts, a business consulting firm. She is also on the Board of Directors of Green Mountain Coffee Roasters, a for-profit coffee company.

== Public life ==
- Former chair of the Lake Champlain Chamber of Commerce.
- Member Burlington Airport Commission.
- Trustee of Champlain College.
- New England Culinary Institute (precise role not specified in official biographies listed below).
- Co-chair, Council of Educational Governance.
- State Senator, elected in 2002 and reelected in 2004 and 2006. She currently serves on the Economic Development, Housing & General Affairs and Education Committee.

== See also ==
- Members of the Vermont Senate, 2005-2006 session
- Members of the Vermont Senate, 2007-2008 session
