= Training bra =

Lightweight brassiere for people who have begun to develop breasts

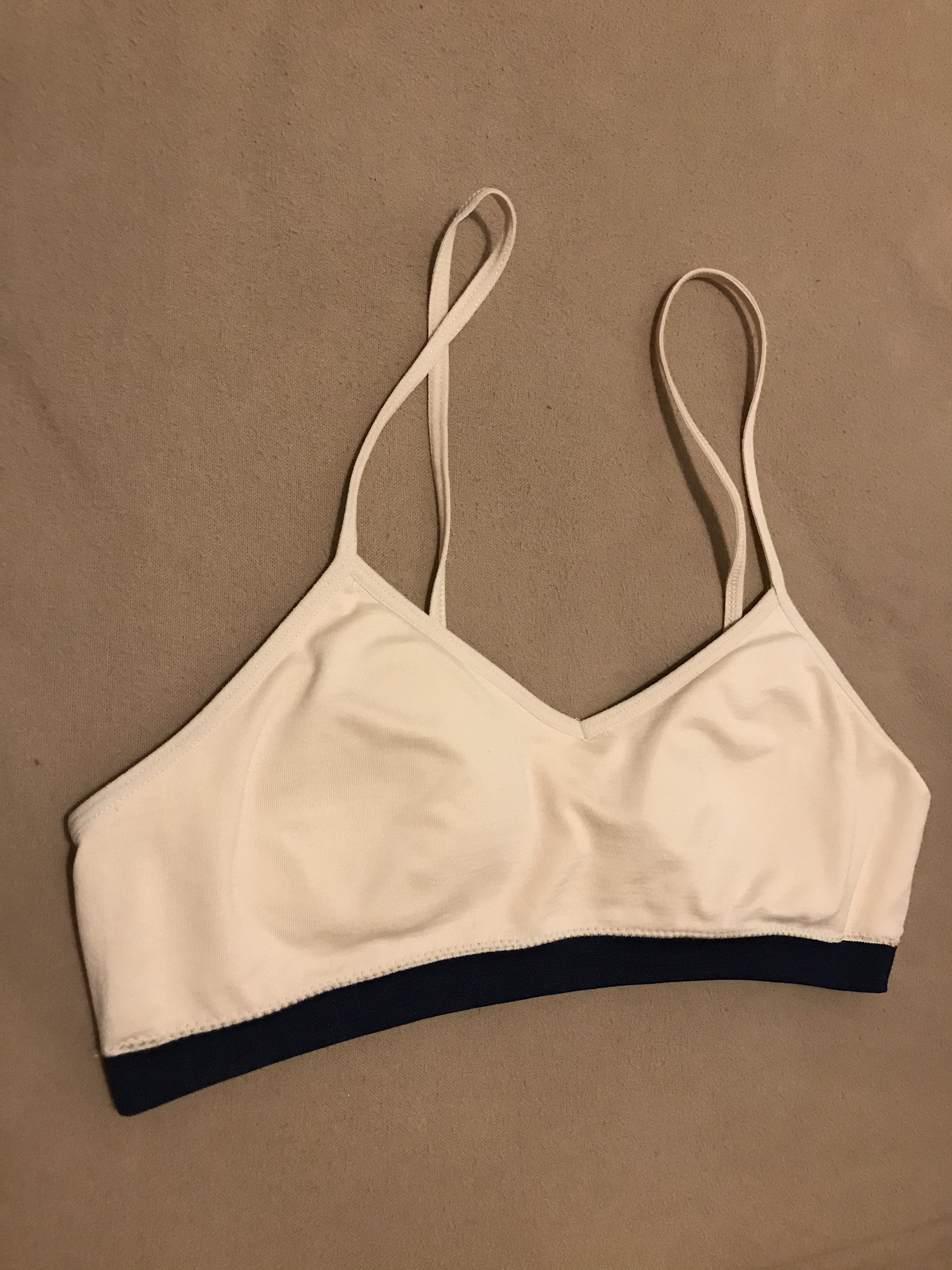
A Fruit of the Loom training bra

A training bra (also trainer bra, starter bra, or first bra) is a lightweight brassiere designed for girls who have begun to develop breasts, at Tanner stage II and III. The training bra is intended to be worn during puberty when the breasts are not yet large enough to fit a standard-sized bra. Training bras often provide minimal or no support, and may serve aesthetic purposes to fulfill cultural norms and local beauty standards.

Training bras are usually made of a lightweight material. They are unlined and feature a soft, elastic bra band and soft bra cups. Some have begun wearing sports bras, which are similar in construction, as their first bra. Prior to the marketing of training bras in the 1960s, a preteen or young teen in Western countries usually wore a camisole.

Receiving one's first bra may be seen as a long-awaited rite of passage in one's life, signifying one's coming of age. Bras for pre-teens and those entering puberty were first marketed during the early 20th century, and sales spiked in the 1950s and 1960s.

== Styles ==
Training bras are usually a lightweight, soft-cup design, unlined, and may resemble a crop top. They are often made of a mixed cotton spandex or cotton Lycra fabric with thin straps and elastic under the growing breasts to hold the garment in place. Training bras may be sold in small, medium, and large sizes, and may be used to conceal nipples and breast buds under outerwear. Some are built into camisoles. They are made in a variety of colors and prints, including lace. As the breasts continue to develop, usually around Tanner stage III, regular bras are available in sizes 30AAA to 38B. The initial training bras offer little if any actual support. Some styles are padded to hide developing breast buds or to increase the perceived size of the breasts.

== History ==
Prior to the 1950s, girls in Western countries typically wore undershirts until their breasts were large enough to fit an adult bra. During the 1940s and 1950s, Western media created a "mammary fixation" that shaped teen perceptions of breast size. Boys noticed girls who were more "busty," and particularly American girls were more aware of breast size and their weight. Popular American culture in the 1950s was notable for its focus on full-breasted women like Lana Turner and Jane Russell. The emphasis on the female figure came from several sources: girls wanted bras at an earlier age than ever before, while their mothers felt they should help their daughters develop a "good" figure; doctors who valued maternity over all other female roles; and companies who saw a profit in persuading girls and their parents that adolescent breasts needed support. In some social circles, a girl's ability to fill a bra became central to her status and sense of self.

During the 1950s, doctors in the United States wrote that teen girls needed to wear a bra to prevent sagging breasts, poor circulation, and stretched blood vessels. In magazines like Seventeen and Compact, adolescent girls were encouraged to purchase undergarments like "Bobbie" bras, Formfit girdles, and "Adagio" by Maidenform that were "teen-proportioned".

It became common in the 1950s for pre-teen girls in the United States to begin wearing training bras even though their breasts were too small to actually require support. The American Academy of Pediatricians published Puberty: Information for Boys and Girls in 2002. In it, they advised girls:

As your breasts develop, you may need a bra. Some girls feel that wearing a bra for the first time is exciting—it is the first step toward becoming a woman! However, some girls feel embarrassed, especially if they are among the first of their friends to need a bra. If the people around you make a bigger deal of your first bra than you would like, try to remember that they do not mean to embarrass you, they are just proud of how much you have grown. [original emphasis]

The author points out that young girls are socialized to be more concerned about what other people think about them wearing a bra rather than their own feelings. As a result, young girls may be anxious to acquire their first training bra before their breasts actually need support, if only for social purposes. Girls are then faced with the challenge of keeping current and wearing the latest, fashionable bra. Some young girls avoid wearing a bra, fearing an end to their childhood freedoms, such as going topless. Girls who develop breasts earlier than their peers may be sensitive to comments and teasing. Because bras are built to manufacturers' standards, if the girl's body does not conform to the shape and size of the bra, she may blame herself.

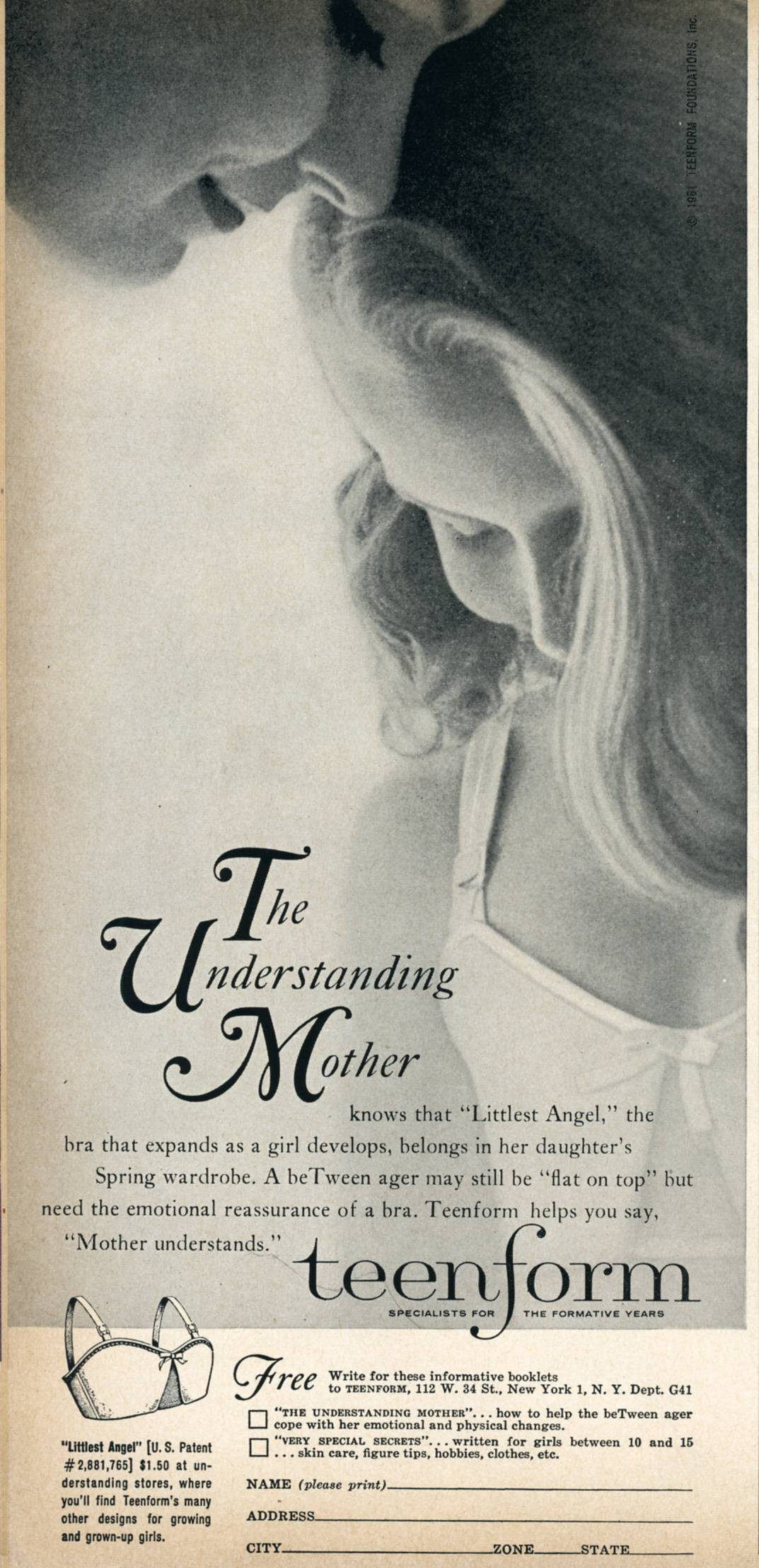
1961 Teenform advertisement promoting a bra for teenage girls

Firm, upright breasts are typical of youth. As such, they may not physically require the support of a bra. A pencil test, developed by Ann Landers, has sometimes been promoted as a criterion to determine whether a girl should begin wearing a bra: a pencil is placed under the breast, and if it stays in place by itself, then wearing a bra is recommended; if it falls to the ground, it is not.

In the early 1960s, bra makers marketed to girls 13–19, and later in '60s they targeted pre-teen girls age 10–12. New labels like Teenform, Teencharm, and Heaventeen catered to their market. Some companies' advertisements showed girls waist up wearing only a bra. Mercy Dobell, editor of Corset and Underwear Review, wrote that "the bra has joined lipstick and 'heels' in becoming one of the beloved symbols of growing up." Mass media encourages teens and tweens to begin wearing lingerie at a younger age, before or as soon as their breasts begin to develop, as a way to advertise their sexuality.

The DeBevoise Company in 1904 ran an advertisement for the "bosom supporter" and named it "brassiere" for the New York advertisement copy. The term brassiere is a Norman French word to describe a child's undershirt. After the advertisement, the Norman French term "brassiere" became popular in the United States of America.

== Social issues ==
The design of some training bras do not provide actual support of any kind, and may serve aesthetic purposes to fulfill cultural norms and local beauty standards.

Young pubescent girls may have ambivalent feelings around the experience of buying and wearing their first bra. Some girls avoid wearing a bra because it means they must deal with teasing and other issues with the onset of puberty. Other girls welcome the experience of being able to show the appearance of a bra through their clothes.

The young girl may feel pressured to wear a bra before she actually needs any support so she can "fit in". Once she begins to wear a bra, she may also be pressured to wear clothing that makes her appear older than she is. Girls may experience the opportunity to begin wearing a bra with mixed feelings. On one hand, they may feel "grown up", but with that status comes a host of expectations about keeping up with the latest styles or colors. Some girls hesitate to accept that some of their childhood freedoms, like going without a shirt or engaging in certain kinds of boyish activities, may be ending.

Some girls are embarrassed about wearing a bra and resist parental pressure to take this step, turning the event into a potentially traumatic experience. If a girl is one of the first or one of the last among her peers to begin wearing a bra, she may be teased. Some welcome and others dislike the new attention they receive because they are wearing a bra. Because bras are mass-produced to fit industry standards, a young girl may not understand that an ill-fitting bra is not her fault and may blame herself, thinking something is wrong with her body.

=== Opposition to training bras ===
Training bras and the age at which girls first wear bras is sometimes controversial. Some people regard training bras as a way to sexualize young girls, and that training bras serve no functional purpose, that businesses benefit financially from, and even encourage, precocious sexuality in girls by exploiting their fears about self-image and social norms. Still, others recognize developing tissue in breasts as sensitive and, at times, needing cover to maintain comfort, even if only psychological, for the wearer.

Bra opponents believe that training bras are used to indoctrinate girls into thinking about their breasts as sexual objects. In their view, bras are not functional undergarments but simply exist to make the body more sexually appealing. They believe that training bras exploit young girls and encourage precocious sexuality.

Within Western cultures that place great value upon youth, bras are marketed to emphasize their ability to preserve a youthful appearance. The design of fashionable rather than solely functional bras has been influenced by changing fashions in outerwear and undergarments. The bra is sometimes viewed as an icon of popular culture that eroticizes girls' breasts as sexual objects.

== Marketing to young girls ==
In 2006, Target stores began stocking Bratz bras and others for 3- to 4-year-olds, Saddle Club bras for 4- to 6-year-olds, and a padded Target brand bra for 8- to 10-year-olds. In the same year, Bonds released the "My First T-Shirt Bra", aimed at girls aged 8 and up, with Australian retailer Big W adding a Just Girls padded bra for 8- to 10-year-olds and a My Little Pony-themed bra for 2- to 3-year-olds around the same time. A Sydney clothing company called Hot Springs offers Lil' Bratz themed "tiny" bras.

== See also ==
- Bralette
- List of bra designs
