= Sports bra =

Bra designed for strenuous exercise

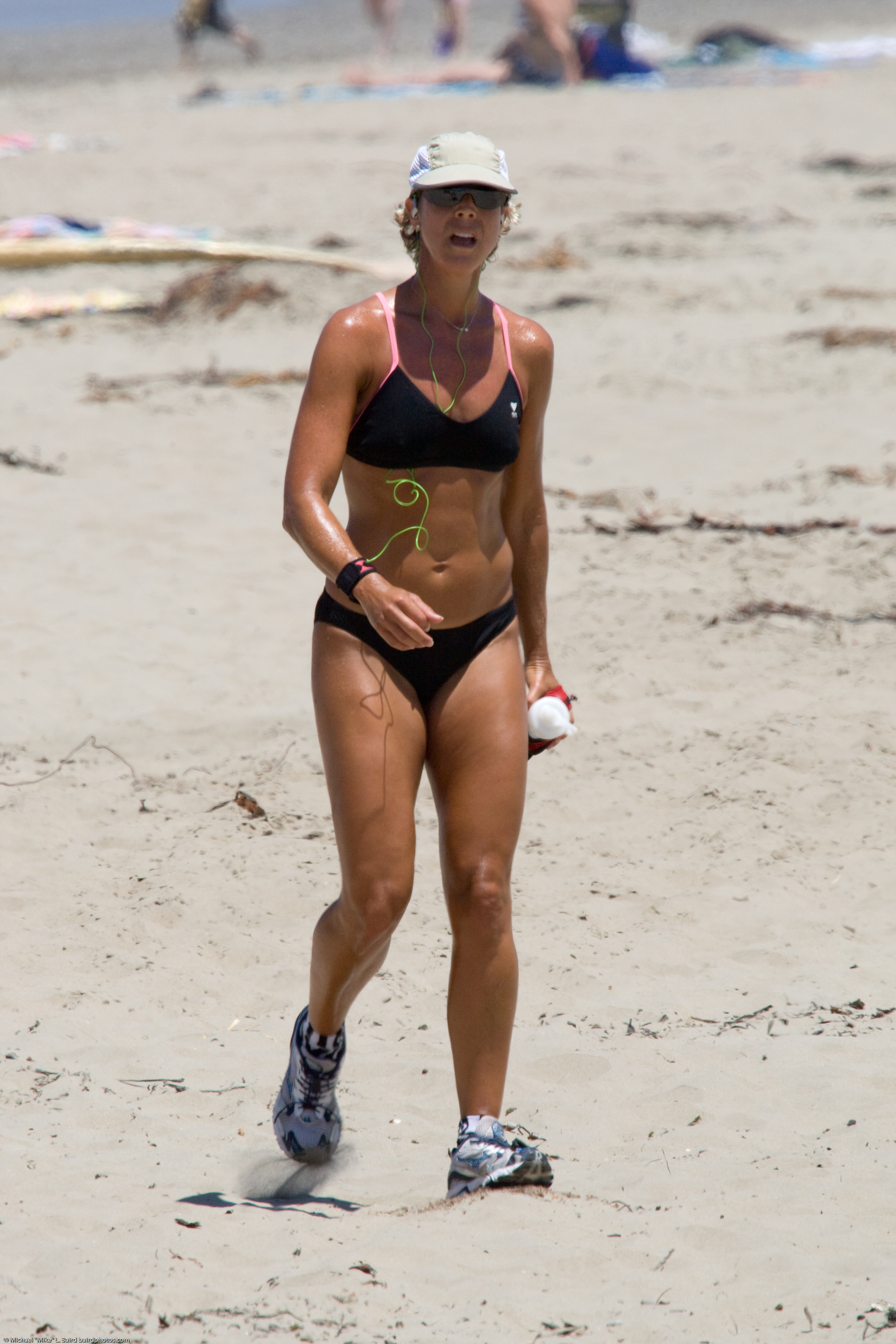
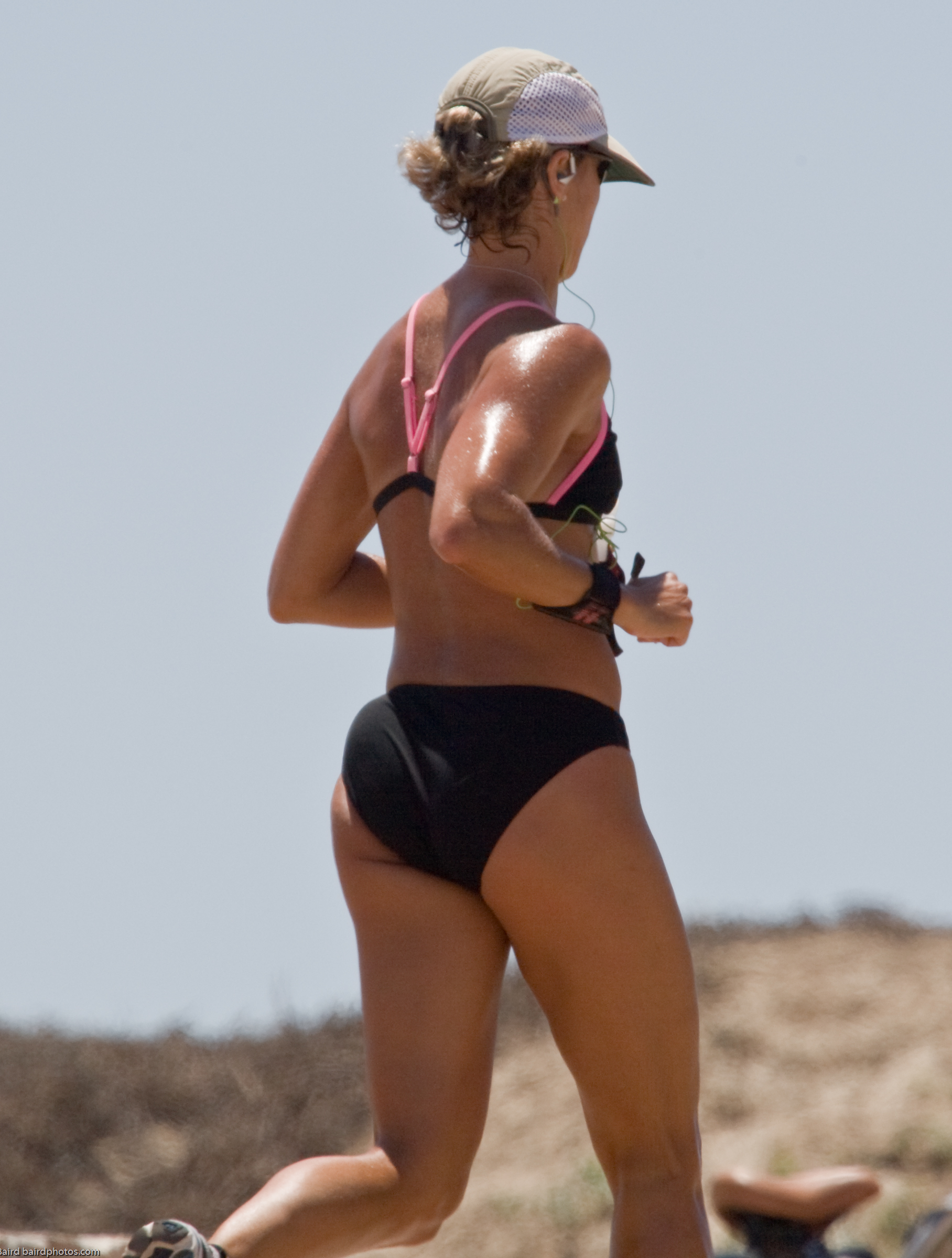
Front view and back view of a woman wearing a sports bra

A sports bra is a bra that provides support to the breasts during physical exercise. Sturdier than typical bras, they minimize breast movement and alleviate discomfort. Many women wear sports bras to reduce pain and physical discomfort caused by breast movement during exercise. Some sports bras are designed to be worn as outerwear during exercise such as running. There are also sports bras with extra padding for exercises that involve some kind of trauma to the breasts.

The sports bra was deemed a serious innovation which gave women the confidence and comfort to play sports, which came with a revolution in women's sport. In 2022 its inventors, Lisa Lindahl, Polly Smith, and Hinda Miller (née Schreiber), were admitted to the US National Inventors Hall of Fame.

== History ==
The first commercially available sports bra was the "Free Swing Tennis Bra" introduced by Glamorise Foundations, Inc. in 1975.

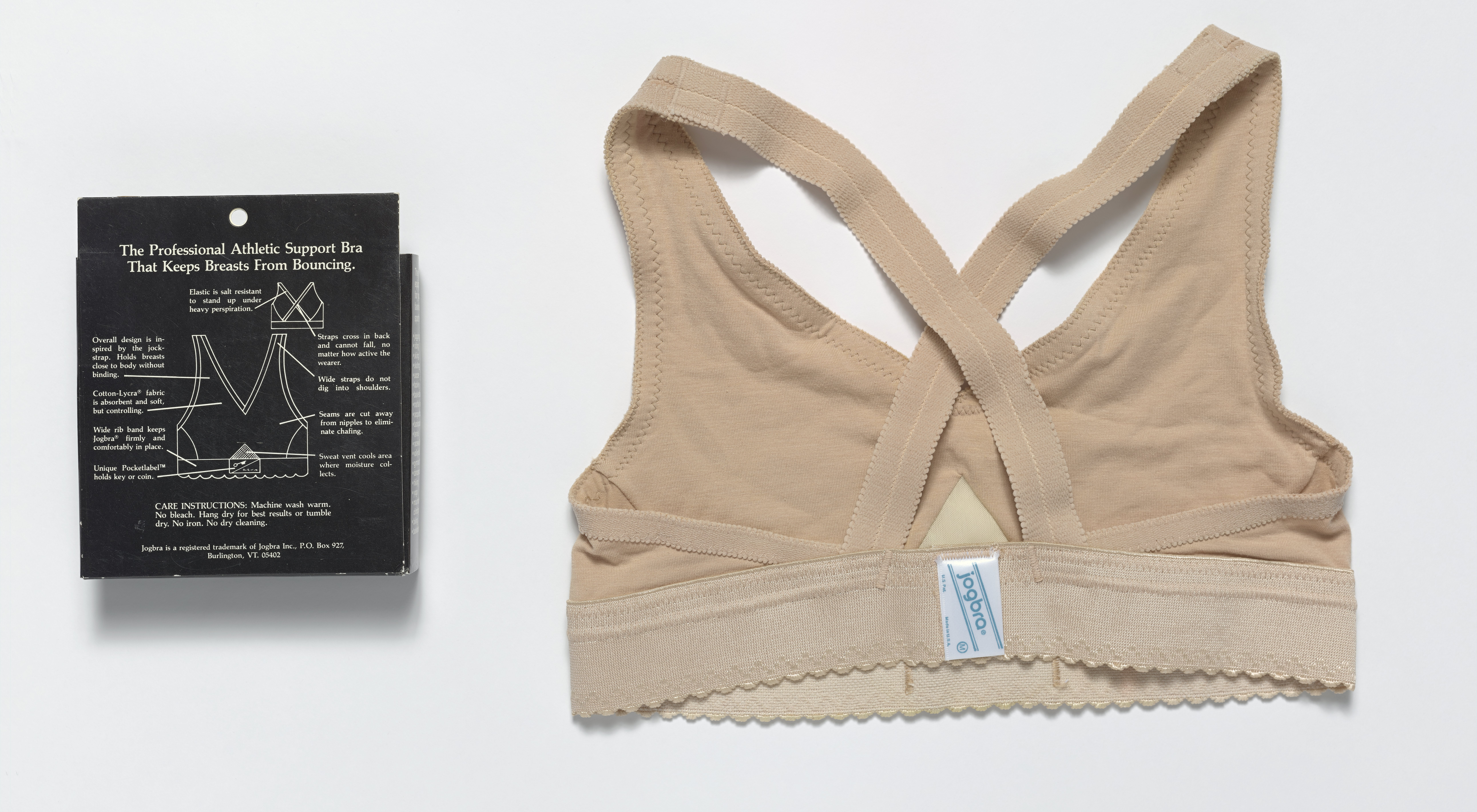
Jogbra, back view with packaging, "The Professional Athletic Support Bra That Keeps Breasts from Bouncing"

The first general exercise bra, initially called a "jockbra", was invented in 1977 by Lisa Lindahl and theater costume designer Polly Smith with the help of Smith's assistant, Hinda Schreiber. Both Lindahl and her sister, Victoria Woodrow, complained about their bad experience exercising in ordinary bras, having experienced runaway straps, chafing and sore breasts. During the course of Lindahl and Smith's exploration for a better alternative, it was suggested that what they needed was a jockstrap for women's breasts. In the costume shop of Royall Tyler Theatre at the University of Vermont, Lindahl and Smith actually sewed two jockstraps together and nicknamed it a "jockbra". It was later renamed a "jogbra". One of their original Jogbras is bronzed and on display near the costume shop of the theatre. Two others are housed by the Smithsonian and another by the New York Metropolitan Museum of Art.

In 1990, Playtex purchased Jogbra from Lindahl and her partners. This was followed by research by Christine Haycock, associate professor of surgery at the University of Medicine and Dentistry of New Jersey. She measured breast movement of women running on treadmills. Sought out by bra manufacturers for her expertise, she advocated wide bottom bands for extra support and firm straps that minimized breast bounce. Renelle Braaten, a Montana hairdresser, struggled to contain her DD-sized breasts while playing racquetball and volleyball. Unable to interest mainstream bra manufacturers, she collaborated with freelance apparel designer Heidi Fisk, and founded Enell Incorporated. After considerable lobbying, she persuaded Oprah Winfrey in 2001 to try her bra. This led to very positive reviews in O: The Oprah Magazine, a 2001 appearance on The Oprah Winfrey Show, and a huge surge in orders.

In 1999, at the 1999 FIFA Women's World Cup Final in Pasadena, California, after scoring the fifth kick in the penalty shootout to give the United States the win over China in the final game, Brandi Chastain celebrated by spontaneously taking off her jersey and falling to her knees in a sports bra. The image is considered as an iconic photograph of a woman celebrating an athletic victory. It was the first time that an international woman footballer had removed her top, exposing her sports bra.

== Design challenges ==
Sports bras can either encapsulate or compress breasts. Bras that encapsulate breasts have molded cups designed to fit around each breast. Bras that compress are designed to restrict movement by holding the breasts firmly against the body. Encapsulation-type bras are generally more effective at reducing discomfort, while compression bras may be more effective for high-intensity activities.

The most common sports bra is basically designed like a tank top with the bottom half cut off. Other designs use gel and water pads, silver fibres, and air bags. A stitchless bra was made by Wacoal, was molded, compressed, and shaped. A compressed bra is designed to push the breasts against the chest to reduce movement and bounce. Other bras are knitted in circular patterns, giving varying stretch and support. A common design uses a stretchable, absorbent fabric such as Lycra designed to reduce irritation by drawing perspiration away from the skin.

Sports bras are also worn by women after certain surgical procedures. In those situations, a front-closing sports bra with a compression, seamless cup is recommended for healing and comfort. Certain fabrics such as Lycra have been found to help reduce swelling and help "even-out" a bustline that has been altered by a surgical procedure.

Sports bras are also manufactured for men with large breasts to enable them to take part more comfortably in physical activity. Some descriptions used euphemistically to describe bras for men are chest binders, compression vests or shimmels.

Problems arise from the shoulder straps of standard bras. Standard well-fitting bras are constructed in the form of a "square frame", with all dimensions adjusted for each woman in a normal standing position, with arms to the sides. When a woman performs an activity which requires her to lift her arms above the shoulders, the frame is strained because it is anchored by the chest band, putting direct pressure on the shoulder trapezius muscles. This may result in neck and shoulder pain, numbness and tingling in the arm and headaches. To avoid such problems the bra's shoulder straps are usually crossed at the back, or the bra is worn halter-style.

== Levels of control ==
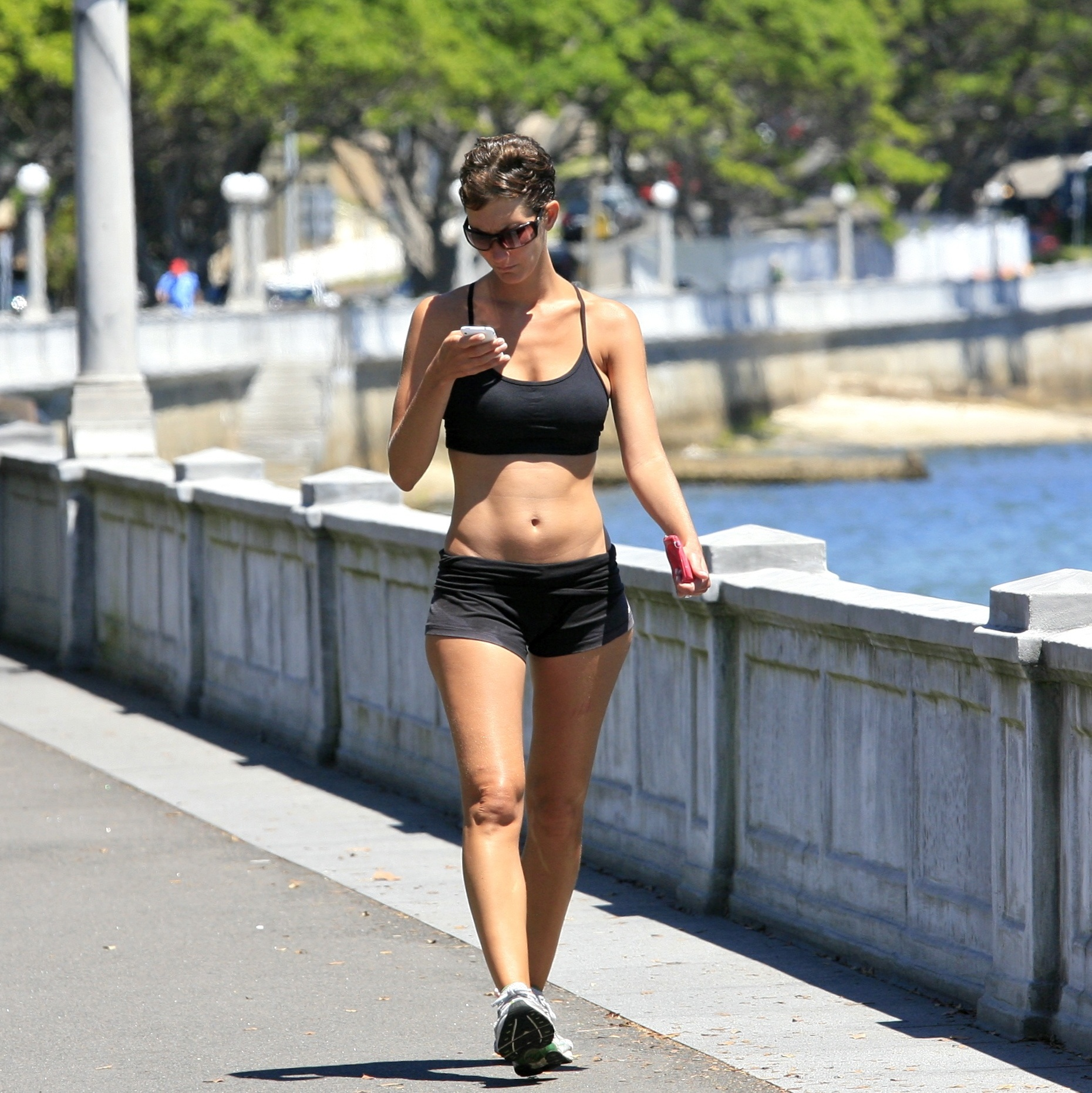
A woman wearing sports-bra and boy shorts as casual wear while walking in public, Sydney, 2012.

Different physical activities require different levels of breast control:

- Yoga, walking and gardening require only "light" control;
- bicycling, power walking and hiking require "moderate" control;
- tennis, football and jogging require "firm" control; and
- running, intense workouts, boxing and horseback riding require "maximum" control.

Some female athletes are concerned that a sports bra may interfere with breathing, but even though increased pressure on the rib cage has been demonstrated, no significant effect on breathing can be shown.

== Benefits ==
All of the women in the United Kingdom's 2020 Olympic team were fitted with custom bras to deliver comfort and benefit. Research by Joanna Wakefield-Scurr indicates that an ill-fitting bra can shorten an athlete's stride by 4 centimetres (1.6 in). A survey found that about a quarter of women athletes suffer breast pain. Women rowers were offered different designs to runners because the latter suffered higher impacts and this necessitated individual support for each breast. In the case of competitive shooters the purpose can just be to keep them out of the way. Lorraine Lambert had a special design because she is a competitive shooter. She has to avoid her breasts touching her gun which could result in disqualification.

== Recognition ==
Lisa Lindahl, Hinda Miller (née Schreiber), and Polly Smith were inducted into the National Inventors Hall of Fame in 2022 for their patented sports bra.

== See also ==
- List of bra designs
- Athleisure
- Fitness fashion
- Spandex
- Sportswear
- Underwear as outerwear
