= Bra =

Undergarment for supporting the breasts

Styles

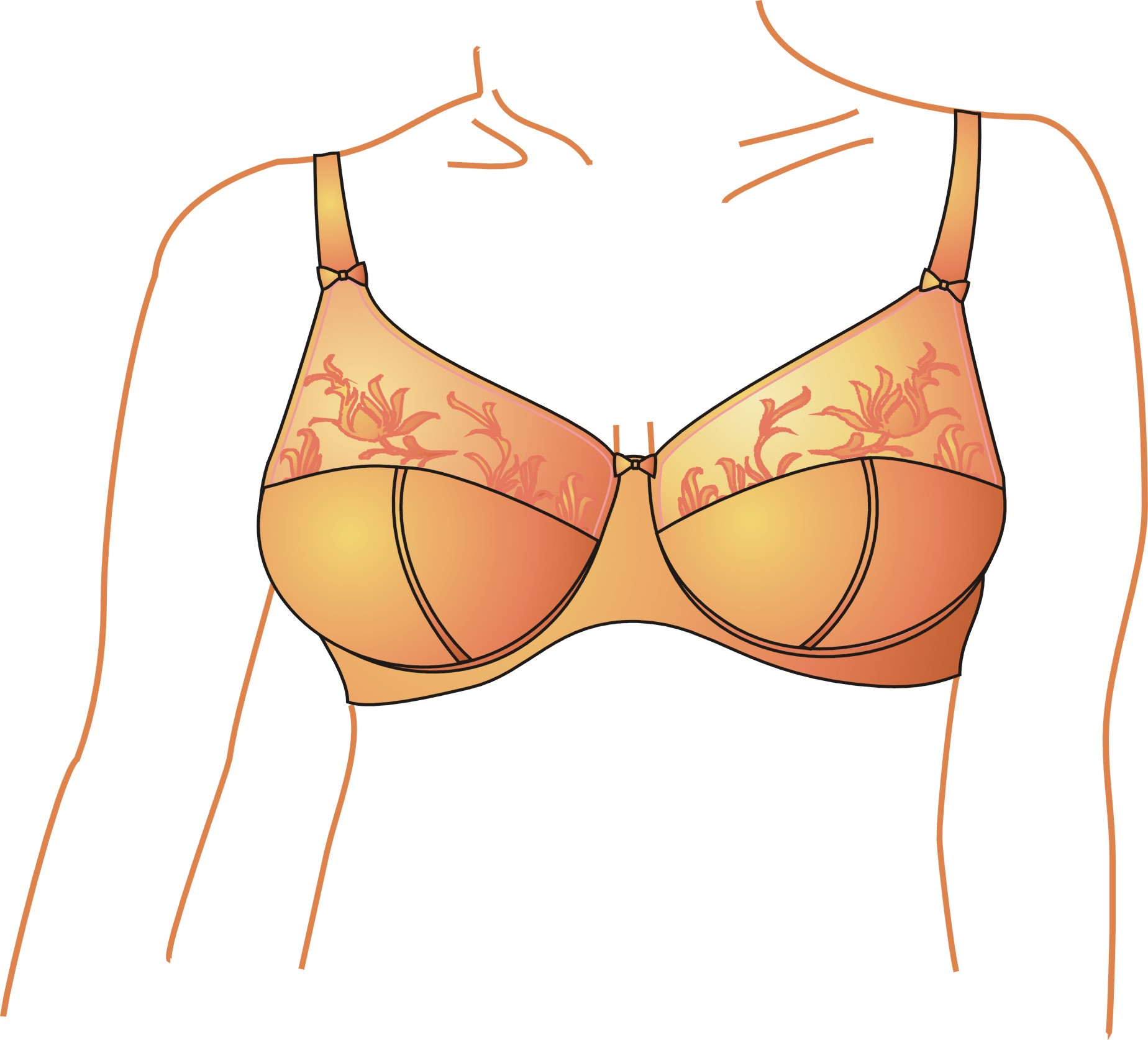
Full-cup bra

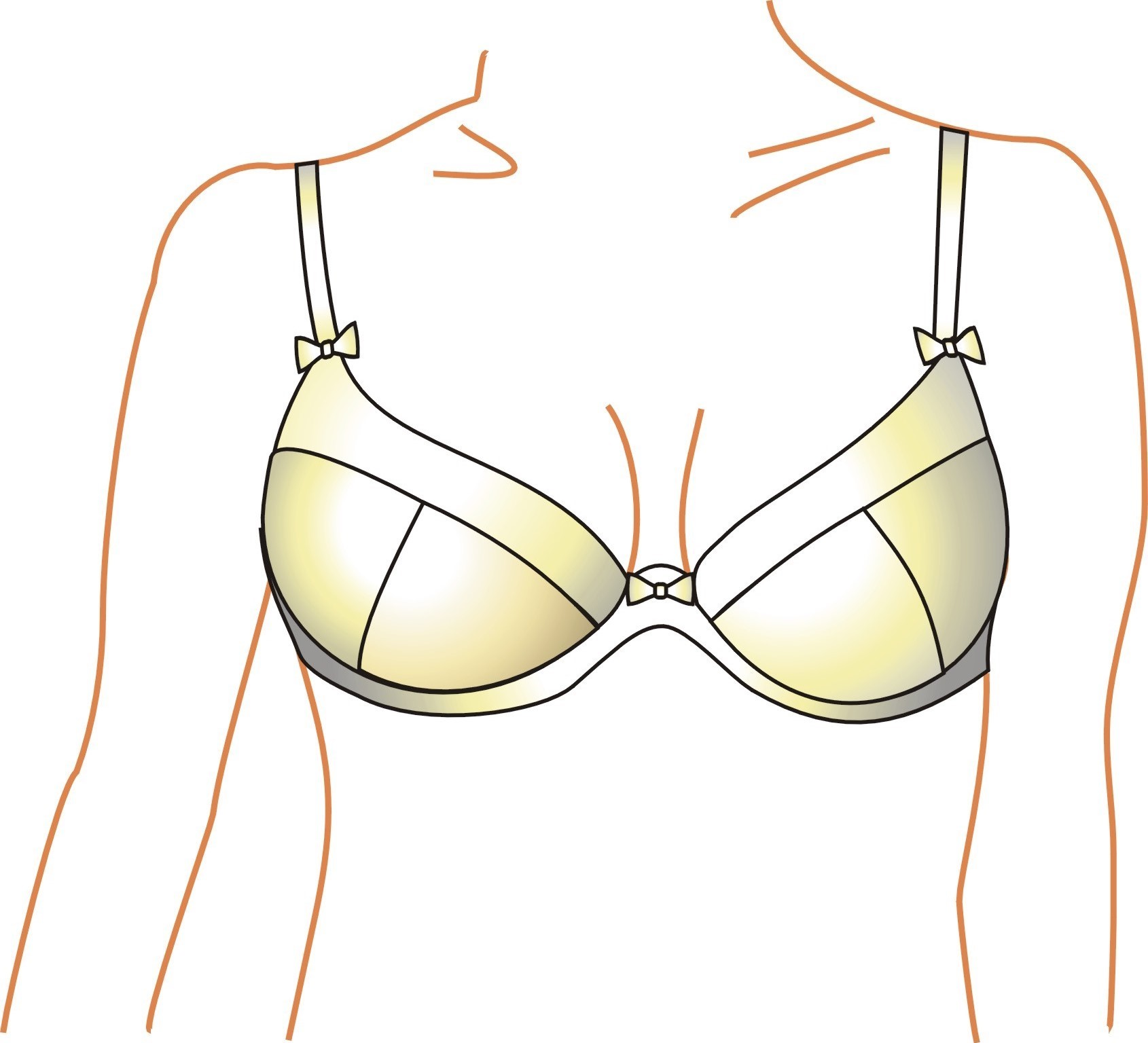
Plunge bra

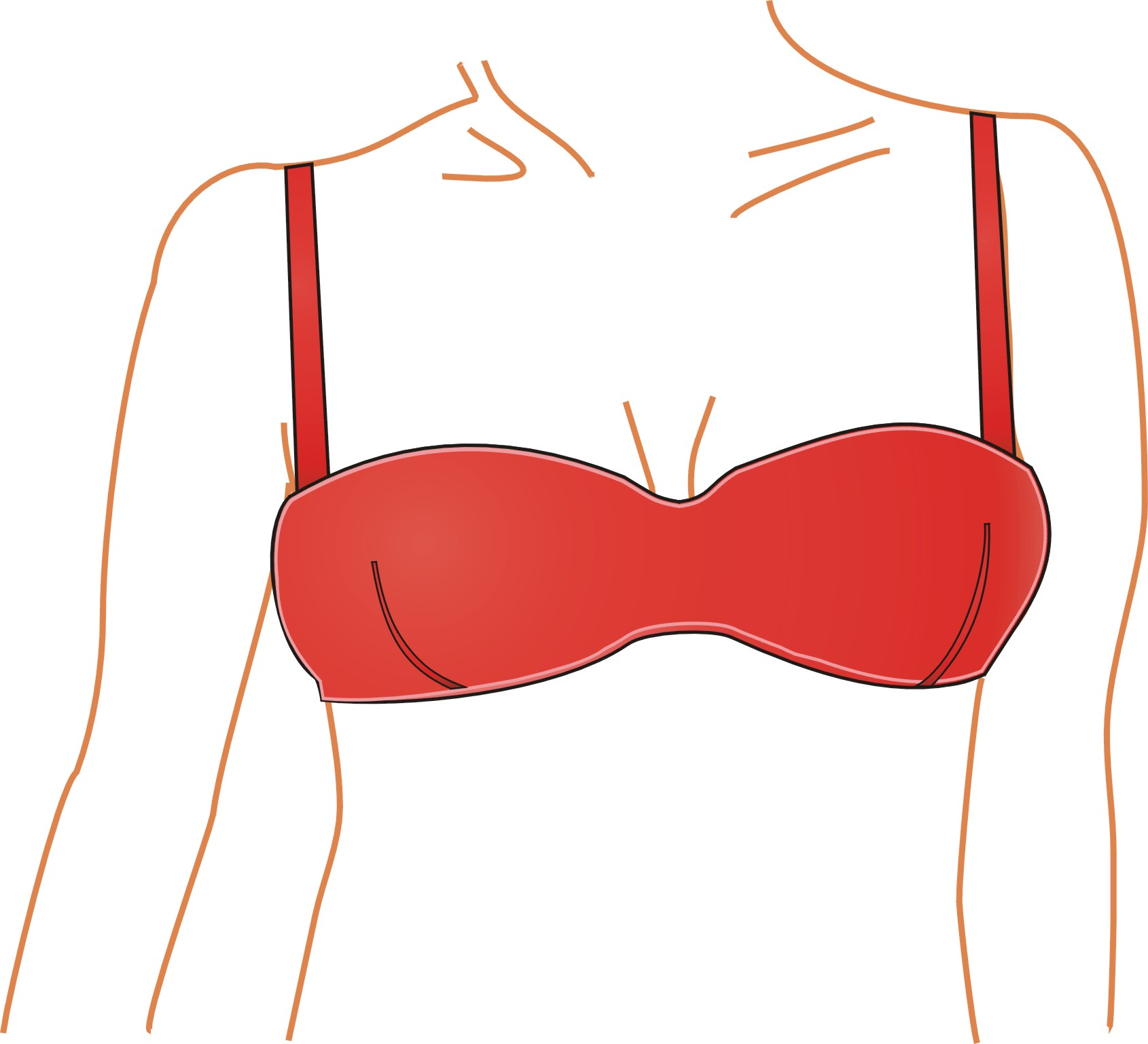
Balconette bra

A bra, short for brassiere or brassière (US: /brəˈzɪər/, UK: /ˈbræsɪər, ˈbræz-/), is a type of form-fitting underwear that is primarily used to support and cover a woman's breasts. A typical bra consists of a chest band that wraps around the torso, supporting two breast cups that are held in place by shoulder straps. A bra usually fastens in the back, using a hook and eye fastener, although bras are available in a large range of styles and sizes, including front-fastening and backless designs. Some bras are designed for specific functions, such as nursing bras to facilitate breastfeeding or sports bras to minimize discomfort during exercise.

Although women in ancient Greece and Rome wore garments to support their breasts, the first modern bra is attributed to 19-year-old Mary Phelps Jacob, who created the garment in 1913 by using two handkerchiefs and some ribbon. After patenting her design in 1914, she briefly manufactured bras at a two-woman factory in Boston, before selling her patent to the Warner Brothers Corset Company, which began mass-producing the garment. The bra gained widespread adoption during the first half of the twentieth century, when it largely replaced the corset. The majority of Western women today wear bras, with a minority choosing to go braless. Bra manufacturing and retailing are key components of the multibillion-dollar global lingerie industry.

== Etymology ==
The term brassiere, from French brassière, of 17th century origin, meaning a woman's or child's short garment covering the arms (Fr: bras) and upper body, was used by the Evening Herald in Syracuse, New York, in 1893. It gained wider acceptance in 1904 when the DeBevoise Company used it in their advertising copy. The French use the term soutien-gorge (literally, "throat-supporter") for the item. It and other early versions resembled a camisole stiffened with boning.

Vogue magazine first used the term brassiere in 1907, and by 1911 the word had entered the Oxford English Dictionary. On 3 November 1914, the newly formed US patent category for "brassieres" was inaugurated with the first patent issued to Mary Phelps Jacob, later and better known as Caresse Crosby. In the 1930s, brassiere/brassière was gradually shortened to bra.

== History ==
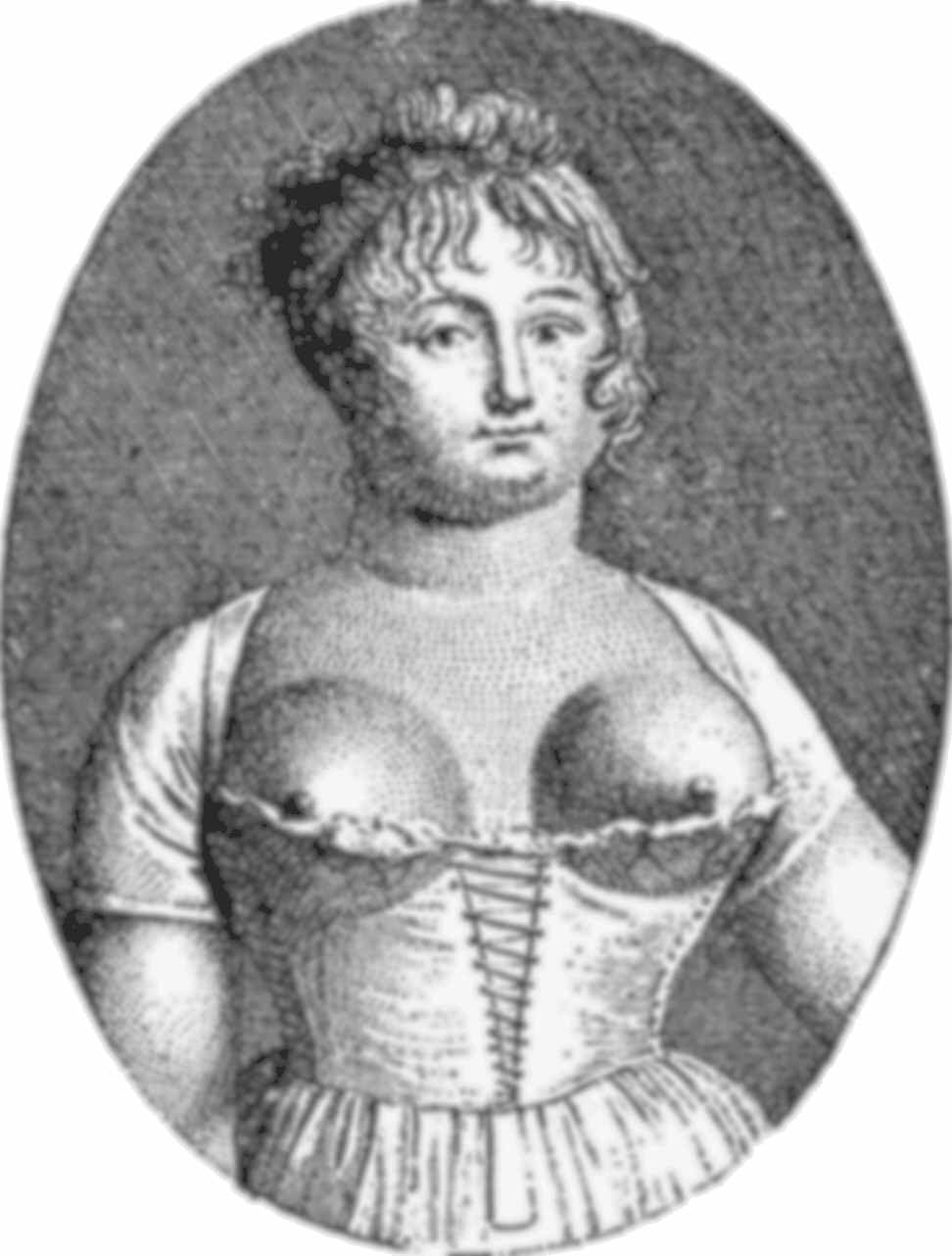
Corset, 1808

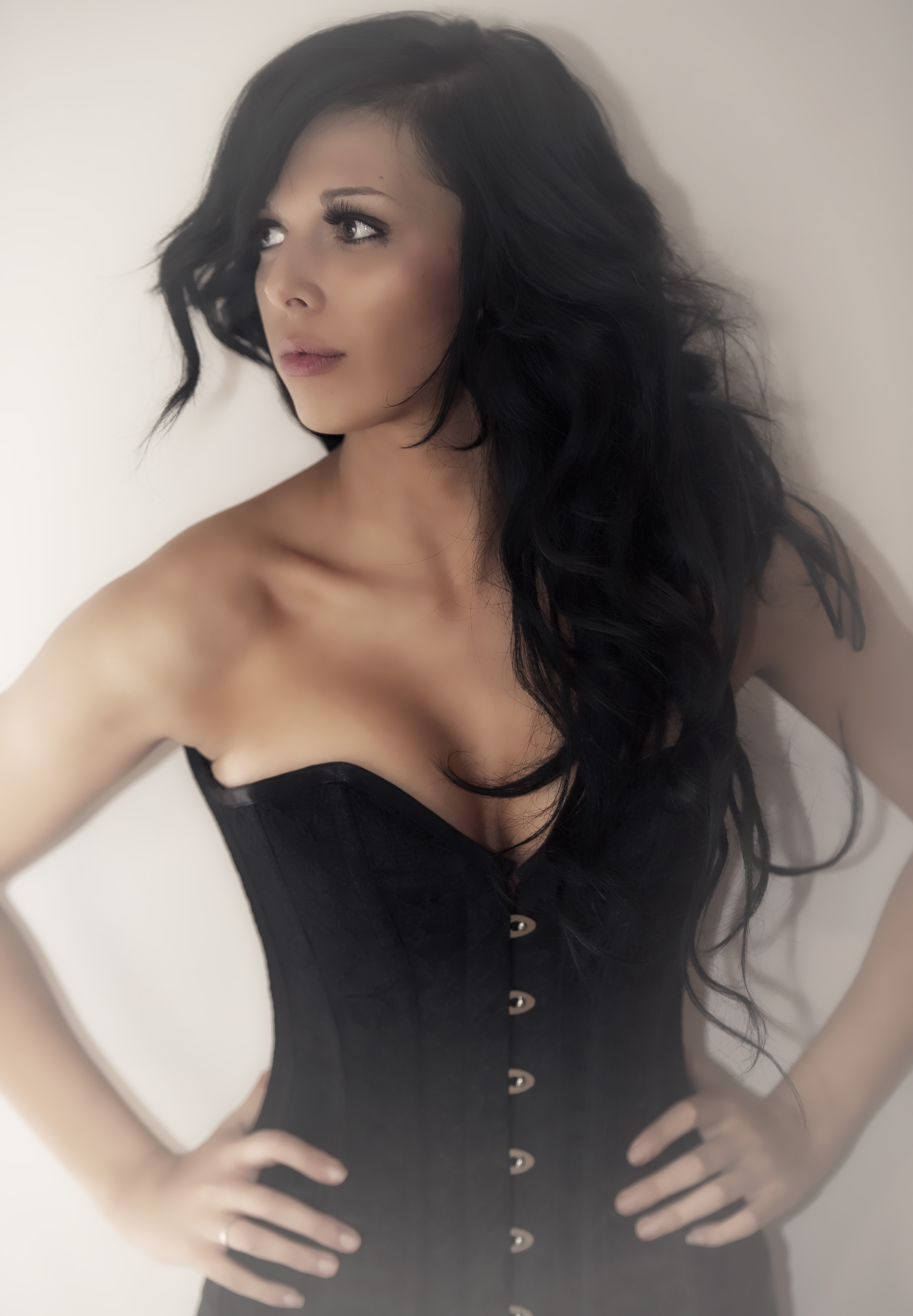
Corset, 2010

The history of the brassière is full of myths in which people like Caresse Crosby, Howard Hughes, Herminie Cadolle and Otto Titzling command center stage.

Before the spread of brassières, the female bust was encased in corsets and structured garments called "bust improvers", made of boning and lace. The history of corsets indicates they started to go out of fashion by 1917, when metal was needed to make tanks and munitions for World War I, and when 1920s fashions emphasized boyish figures.

When corsets became unfashionable, brassières and padding helped to project, display and emphasize the breasts. In 1893, New Yorker Marie Tucek was granted a patent for a "breast supporter", described as a modification of the corset, and was very similar to a modern push-up bra designed to support the breasts. It consisted of a plate made of metal, cardboard or other stiff material shaped to fit against the torso under the breasts, following the contour of the breasts. It was covered with silk, canvas or other cloth, which extended above the plate to form a pocket for each breast. The plate curved around the torso and ended near the armpits.

=== Early brassières ===
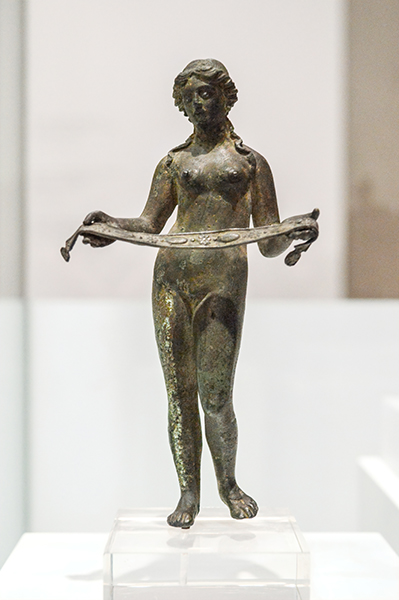
Venus or Aphrodite prepares to put on an apodesmos, bronze statuette, 0-400 CE

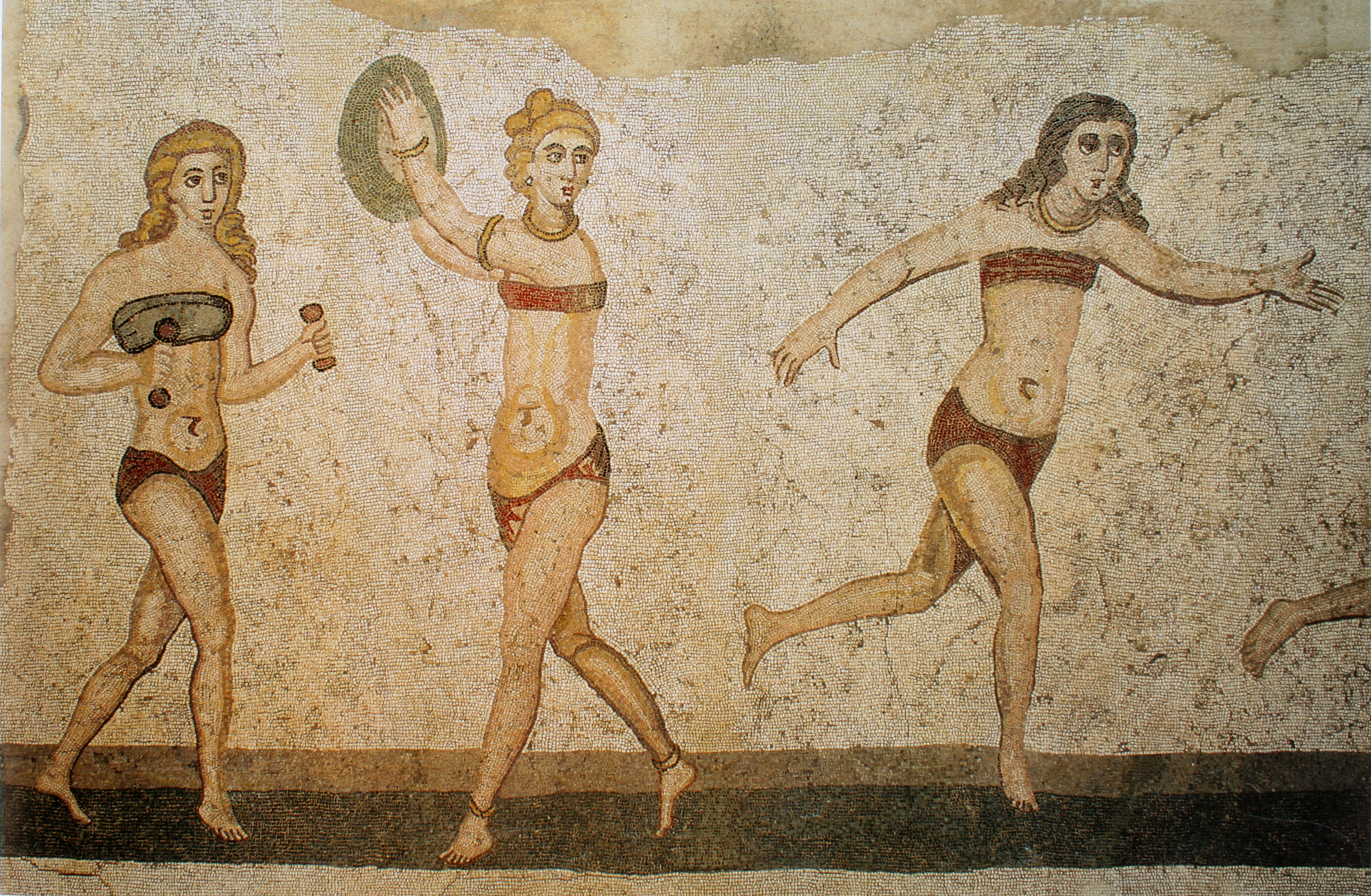
Roman women wearing breast-bands during sport, Villa Romana del Casale, Sicily, 4th century AD

Wearing a garment to support the breasts may date back to ancient Greece. Women wore an apodesmos, later stēthodesmē, mastodesmos and mastodeton, all meaning "breast-band", a band of wool or linen that was wrapped across the breasts and tied or pinned at the back. Roman women wore breast-bands during sport, such as those shown on the Coronation of the Winner mosaic (also known as the "Bikini mosaic").

In 2008, fragments of linen textiles were found at Lengberg Castle in East Tyrol in Austria that were dated to between 1440 and 1485; these fragments greatly resemble modern bras. Two of them had cups made from two pieces of linen sewn with fabric that extended to the bottom of the torso with a row of six eyelets for fastening with a lace or string. One had two shoulder straps and was decorated with lace in the cleavage. The finds illustrate that a version of the bra existed in the Early Modern European fashion, though the few archaeological examples make it difficult to determine how widespread they were.

From the 16th century, the undergarments of wealthier women in the Western world were dominated by the corset, which pushed the breasts upwards. In the later 19th century, clothing designers began experimenting with alternatives, splitting the corset into multiple parts: a girdle-like restraining device for the lower torso, and devices that suspended the breasts from the shoulder to the upper torso.

=== Modern bra ===
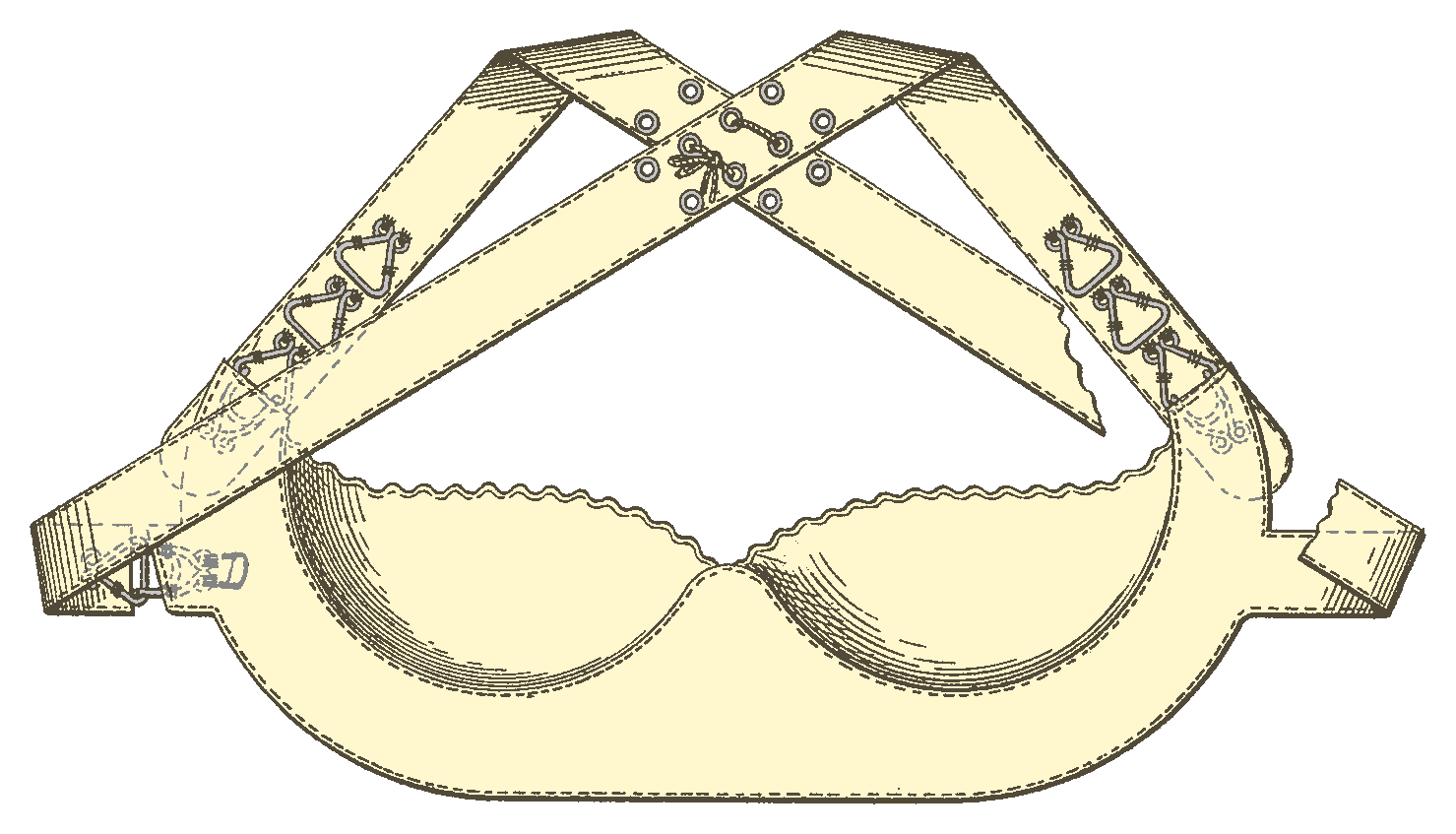
"Breast Supporter" c. 1893

In 1914, the first modern bra was patented by New York publisher, activist, and socialite Caresse Crosby (born Mary Phelps Jacob). Frustrated with a whale bone corset that kept popping through a new party dress, she created the bra from two handkerchiefs and some ribbon to create cleavage.

Crosby sold bras to friends for one dollar. Soon she founded the Fashion Form Brassière Company, with a factory in Boston staffed by two women. Crosby patented the first bra as "the backless brassière" in 1914. After making a few hundred bras and some orders from department stores, she was persuaded by her husband to close the company. She sold the patent to The Warner Brothers Corset Company for US$1,500. In the next 30 years, Warner Brothers made more than US$15 million from the design.

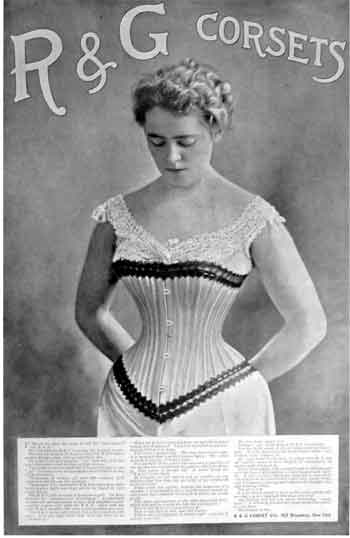
Corset from 1898

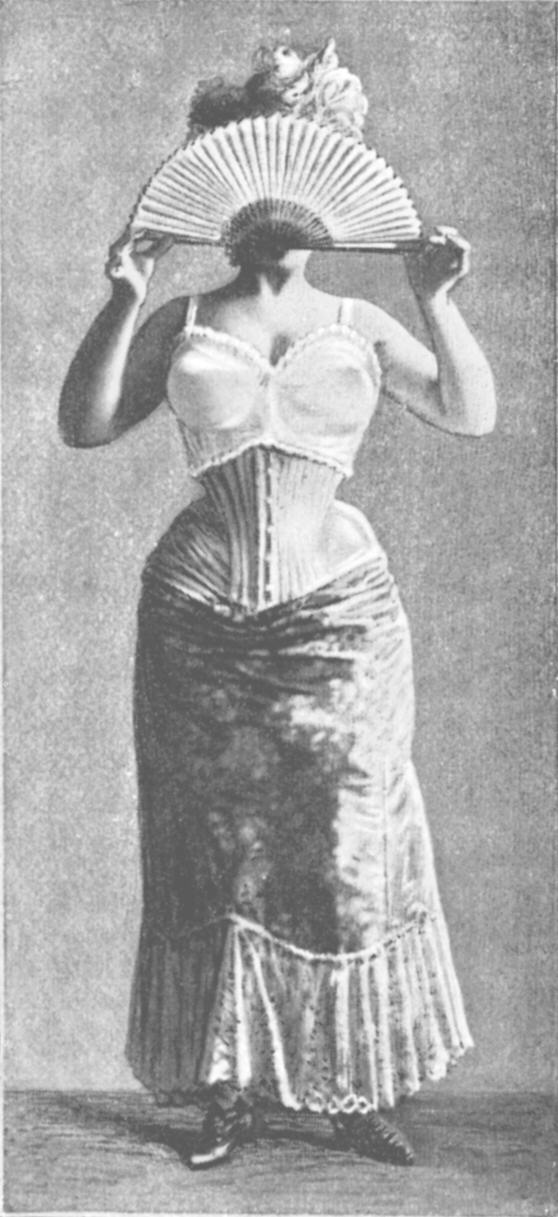
Bodice from 1900

According to Cadolle Lingerie House, Herminie Cadolle, a French inventor, was the first inventor to patent the modern 'brassiere', called the "corselet-gorge", lingerie which separated the upper bra portion from the lower corset, the first step toward the modern bra. An urban legend that the brassière was invented by a man named Otto Titzling ("tit sling") who lost a lawsuit with Phillip de Brassière ("fill up the brassière") originated with the 1971 book Bust-Up: The Uplifting Tale of Otto Titzling and the Development of the Bra and was propagated in a comedic song from the movie Beaches.

Half the patents filed for the design and manufacture of the bra were created by women. The Dresden-based German, Christine Hardt, patented the first modern brassière in 1899. Sigmund Lindauer from Stuttgart-Bad Cannstatt, Germany, developed a brassière for mass production and patented it in 1912. It was mass-produced by Mechanische Trikotweberei Ludwig Maier und Cie. in Böblingen, Germany. In the United States, Mary Phelps Jacob received a patent in 1914 for the first brassière design that is recognized as the basis for modern bras. Mass production in the early 20th century made the garment widely available to women in the United States, England, Western Europe, and other countries influenced by western fashion. Metal shortages in World War I encouraged the end of the corset.

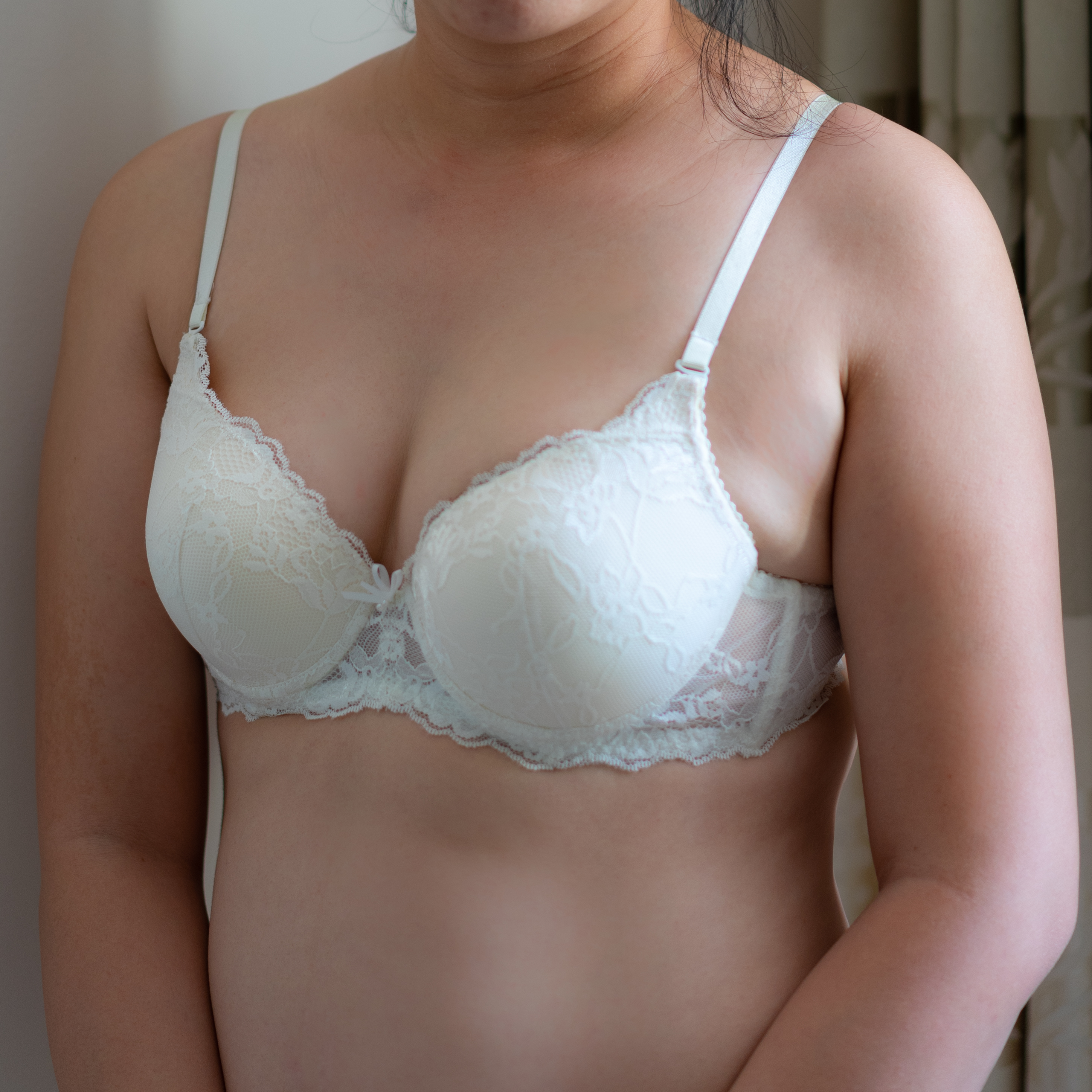
Padded bra

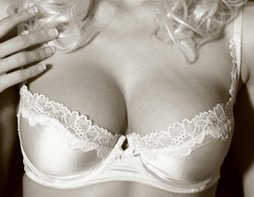
Underwire bra

Development of the underwire bra started in the 1930s, though it did not gain widespread popularity until the 1950s, when the end of World War II freed metal for domestic use. Aviator and filmmaker Howard Hughes designed a prototype for an aerodynamic underwire bra for Jane Russell when filming The Outlaw in 1941. According to Hughes, the resultant amount was "the length of the actual cleavage is five and one-quarter inches." Bras in 1940s left a substantial amount of fabric in the center, thus creating a separation of breasts instead of the pushed-together cleavage of today. Frederick Mellinger of Frederick's of Hollywood created the first padded bra in 1947, followed by an early push-up bra a year later (dubbed "The Rising Star").

A padded bra adds material (foam, silicone, gel, air, or fluid) to the cups to help the breasts look fuller. There are different designs, from a slight lift to a highly pushed-up effect, that provide coverage and support, hides nipples, add shape to breasts that are far apart and adds comfort. Graduated padding uses more padding at the bottom of the cups that gradually tapers off towards the top. There also are semi-padded bras that suits deep neck dresses. With the advent of padded bras, sales of removable pads took a plunge, though some padded bras also have removable inserts. Actress Julia Roberts was required to wear a custom made silicone gel filled bra for the movie Erin Brockovich in order to increase her cleavage.

Brassières were initially manufactured by small production companies and supplied to retailers. The term "cup" was not used until 1916, and manufacturers relied on stretchable cups to accommodate different sized breasts. Women with larger or sagging breasts had the choice of long-line bras, built-up backs, wedge-shaped inserts between the cups, wider straps, Lastex, firm bands under the cup, and light boning.

In October 1932, the S.H. Camp and Company correlated the size and pendulousness of breasts to letters A through D. Camp's advertising featured letter-labeled profiles of breasts in the February 1933 issue of Corset and Underwear Review. In 1937, Warner began to feature cup sizing in its products. Adjustable bands were introduced using multiple hook and eye closures in the 1930s. By the time World War II ended, most fashion-conscious women in Europe and North America were wearing brassière, and women in Asia, Africa, and Latin America began to adopt it.

==== 1960s–1980s ====
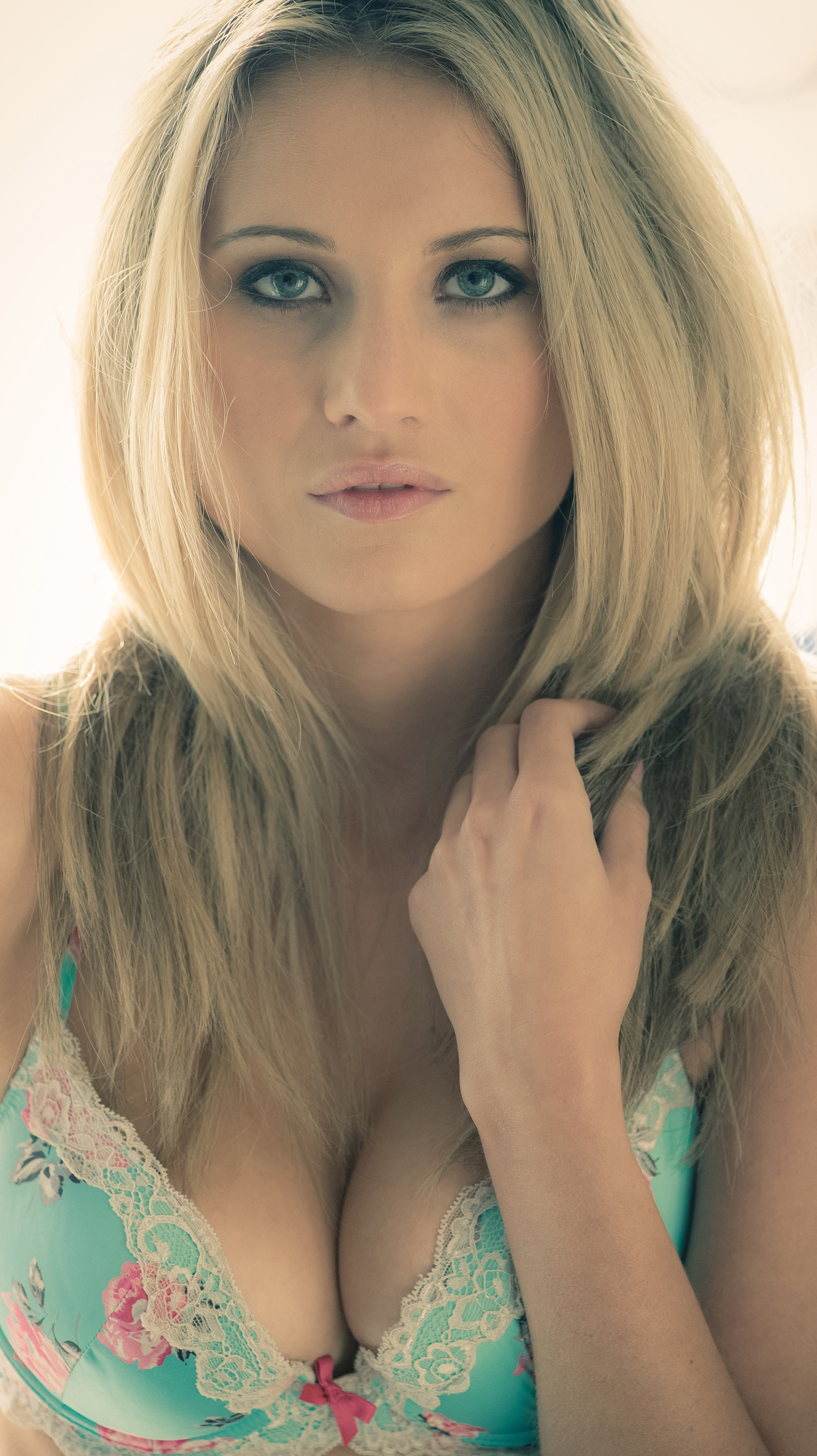
Push up bra

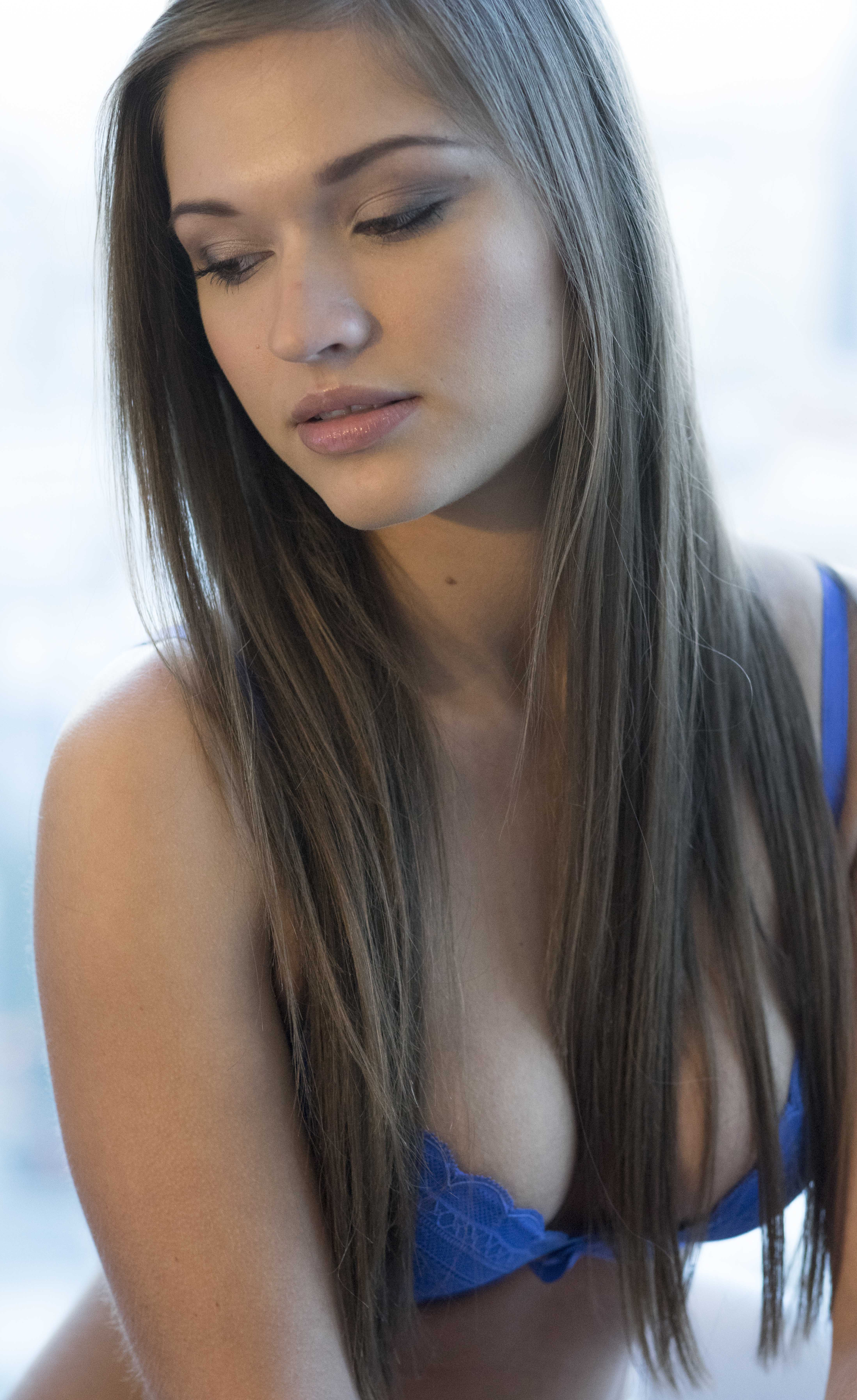
Plunge bra

In fall 1963 and spring 1964, the Western fashion trends were dominated by plunging necklines, while audiences were charmed by movies like Tom Jones that portrayed "aggressive cleavages". Lingerie and Shapewear manufacturers like Warner Brothers, Gossard, Formfit, and Bali took the opportunity to market plunge bras. A plunge bra covers the nipples and bottom of the breasts while leaving the top part bare making it suitable for low-cut tops and deep V-necks. It also has a lower, shorter and narrower center gore that maintains support while increasing cleavage by allowing the gore to drop several inches below the middle of the breasts. Plunge bras comes in different depths that provide great cleavage. Like a push up bra these have some padding and provide support, as well as to help push the breasts together and create cleavage. Bali and Vassarette also marketed lace bras that maximized cleavage.

The first push-up bra was created in 1964 by Canadian Louise Poirier and patented for Wonderbra (trademarked in 1935), then owned by Canadelle, a Canadian lingerie company in 1971. A push up bra is designed to press the breasts upwards and closer together to give a fuller appearance with help of padded cups, differing from other padded bras in location of the pads. It leaves the upper and inner area of breasts uncovered adding more cleavage. These are available in many designs and every size starting from A to E. Most of the push-up bras have underwires for added lift and support, while the padding is commonly made of foam.

==== 1990s onward ====
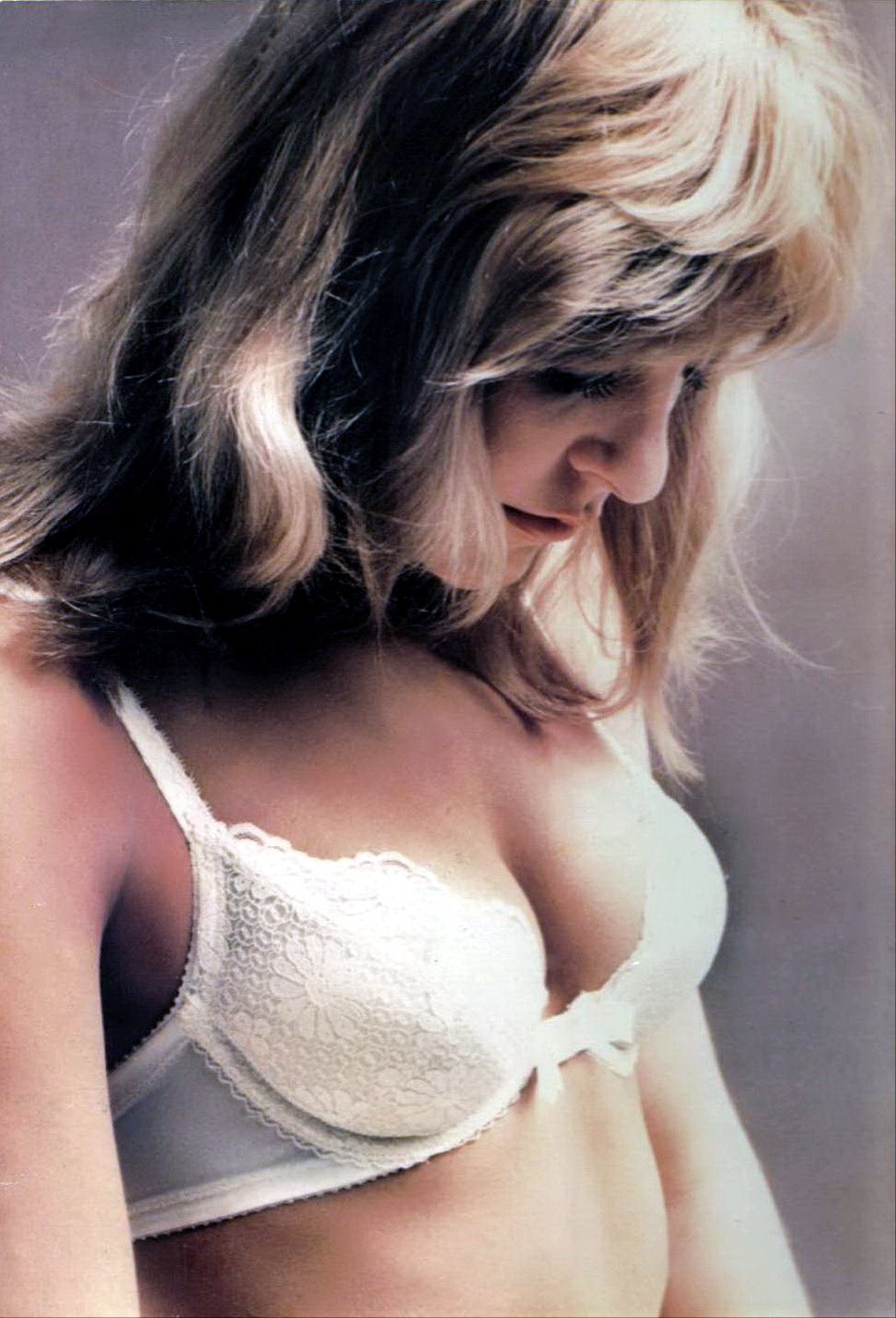
Wonderbra (1975)

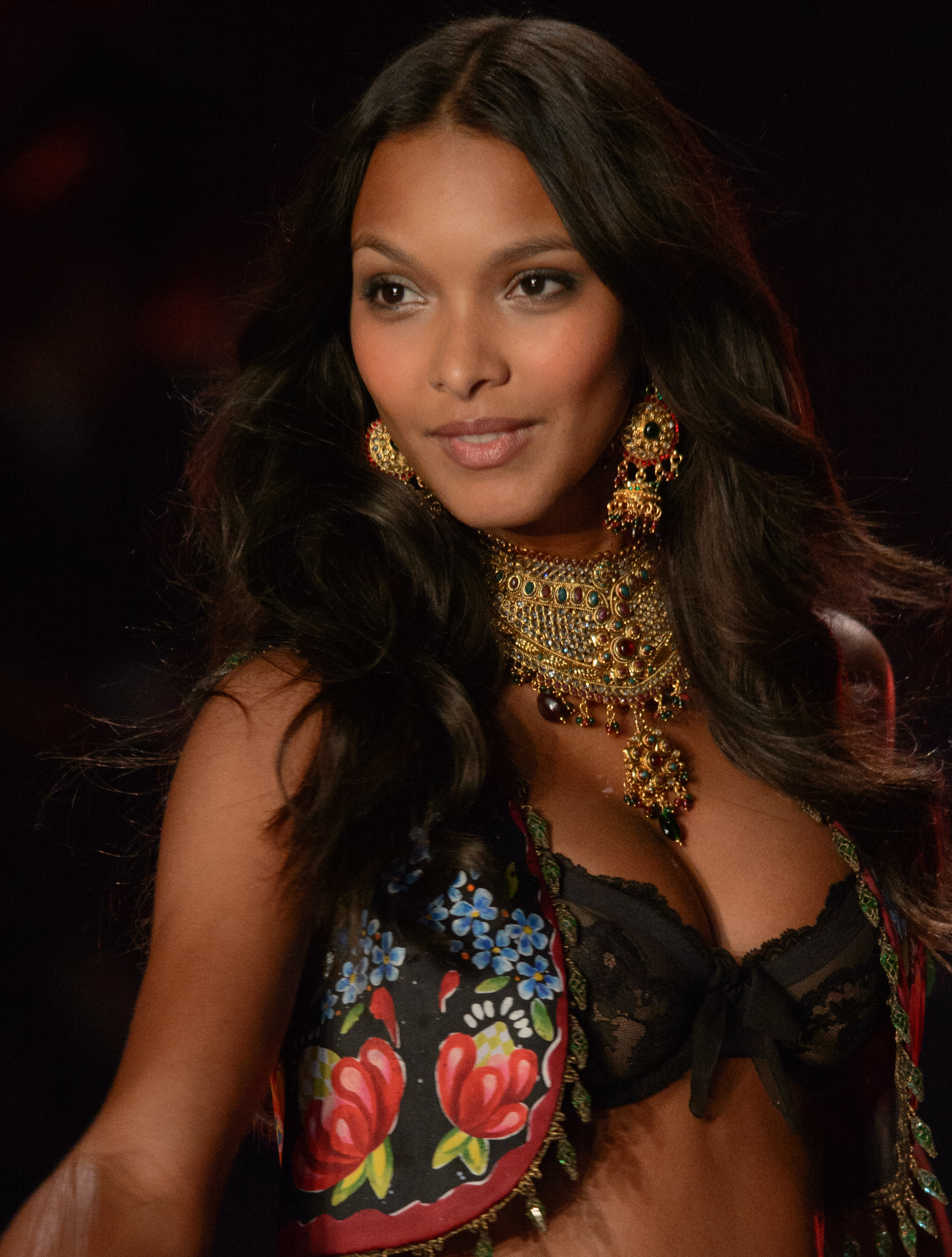
Victoria's Secret (2014)

The Wonderbra brand was acquired, in 1994, by Sara Lee Corporation and, since 2006, licensed to HanesBrands Inc and Sun Capital for different markets. It had 54 design elements, including a three-part cup, underwires, a precision-angled back, rigid straps, and removable "cookies". When the push-up plunge bra first appeared in the US market one Wonderbra sold every 15 seconds, driving a first year sale of US$120 million. The bra became one of the most complex pieces of lingerie ever created.

In 1994, supermodel Eva Herzigova's cleavage photographed by Ellen von Unwerth for Wonderbra's controversial advertising campaign Hello Boys helped shape the ideal of women, an experience Herzigova described as "empowering". In 1999, the advertising poster was placed at 10th position in the Poster of the Century competition compiled by trade magazine Campaign. In 2011, it was voted the top advertising campaign of all time in a poll by Outdoor Media Centre, and advertising and marketing portal, and was featured in an exhibition at the Victoria and Albert Museum. It helped to bring the brand into forefront of the competition for cleavage after 30 years of relative obscurity. On the first Friday of every April in South Africa, brassière marketer Wonderbra sponsors a National Cleavage Day.

America's largest lingerie retailer Victoria's Secret was launched by Roy Raymond, a Stanford alumnus, in San Francisco in late 1970s with a similar appeal. Victoria's Secret Angels held its first fashion show at Plaza Hotel in New York in 1995. Even traditional brands, who were producing 1950s style pointy-cups, low-backs, low-fronts and no-straps, like Maidenform joined the competition in 1995. In 1999 the event was first webcast. By 2001, the event was being aired on network television with 12 million viewers for the first broadcast. Other lingerie manufacturers like Frederick's of Hollywood and Agent Provocateur also joined the competition by that time, with the former introducing a design called Hollywood Extreme Cleavage Bra that helped give the impression of a spherical cleavage like augmented breasts that was popularized by stars like Pamela Anderson.

The underwire bra utilizes a wire sewn into the bra fabric and under each cup, from the center gore to under the wearer's armpit. It helps to lift, separate, shape, and support the breasts. These bras use a thin strip of metal, plastic or resin, usually with a nylon coating at both ends. Some underwire bra styles also come in soft cup versions. Underwire bras accounted for 60% of the United Kingdom bra market in 2000 and 70% in 2005. About 70% of women who wear bras wear a steel underwire bra according to underwear manufacturer industries of New York in 2009. In 2001, 70% (350 million) of the bras sold in the United States were underwire bras. In 2005, underwire bras were the fastest growing segment of the market. It has been suggested that underwire bras may restrict the flow of blood and lymph fluid around the breasts, preventing drainage of toxins, but no evidence has emerged to support this claim.

In the next decade, particularly during the COVID-19 lockdowns, bralettes and soft bras started replacing underwired and padded bras, sometimes also serving as an outerwear. At the same time popularity of brands like Victoria's Secret decreased significantly. Sarah Shotton, creative director of Agent Provocateur, attributes this to a shift in consumer focus to "the athletic body, health and wellbeing", rather than "the male gaze;" according to independent lingerie designer Araks Yeramyan "It was #MeToo that catapulted the bralette movement into what it is today." Some bralettes still provide plunging designs, light padding, bottom support or significant cleavage.

== Manufacture ==
=== Construction ===
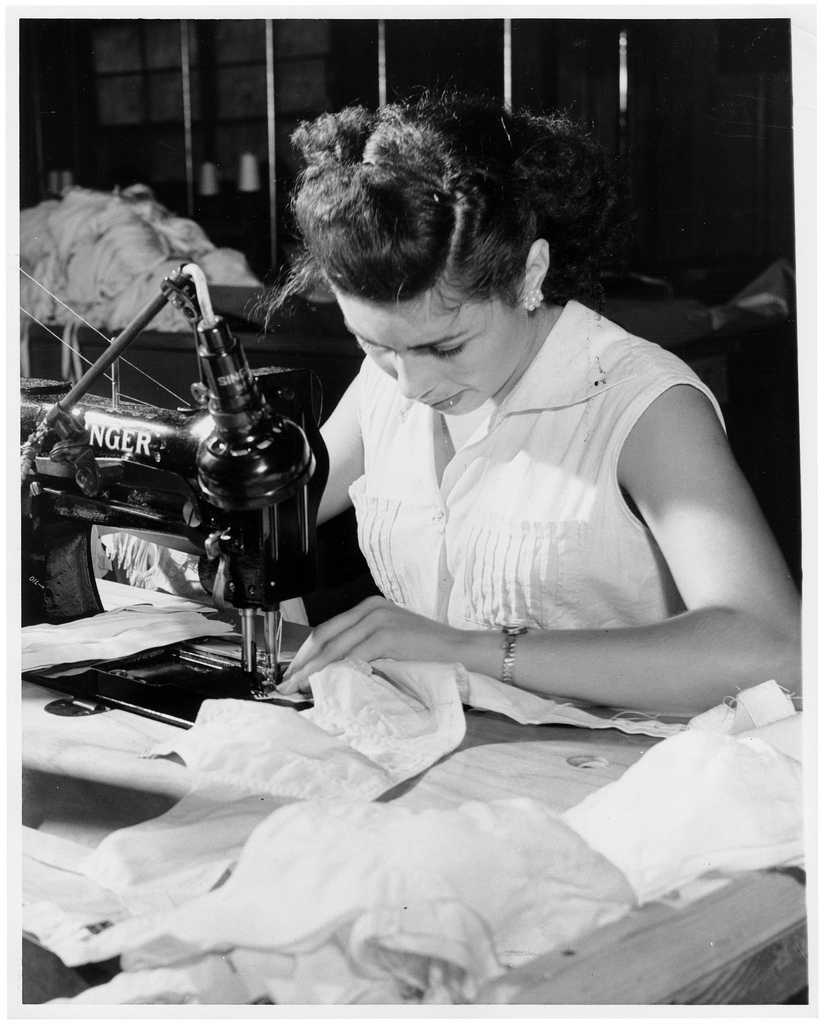
A seamstress sews a bra in Puerto Rico

Mass-produced bras are manufactured to fit a prototypical woman standing with both arms at her sides. The design assumes that both breasts are equally sized and symmetrical. Manufacturing a well-fitting bra is a challenge since the garment is supposed to be form-fitting but women's breasts may sag, vary in volume, width, height, shape, and position on the chest. Manufacturers make standard bra sizes that provide a "close" fit, however even a woman with accurate measurements can have a difficult time finding a correctly fitted bra because of the variations in sizes between different manufacturers. Some manufacturers create "vanity sizes" and deliberately mis-state the size of their bras in an attempt to persuade women that they are slimmer and more buxom.

A bra is one of the most complicated garments to make. A typical design has between 20 and 48 parts, including the band, gore, side panel, cup, apex, neckline, underwire, strap, ring, slider, strap join, and closure. Bras are built on a square frame model. Lingerie designer Chantal Thomass said,

It's a highly technical garment, made of lots of tiny pieces of fabric, with so many sizes to consider for the different cups, etc. It's a garment you wash every day, so the seams and structure need to be extremely robust. It's very different from a piece of clothing; it's in direct contact with the skin, it needs to be super solid.

The primary component offering the most support is a chest band that wraps around the torso. It supports two cups that are usually held in place by two shoulder straps. The chest band is usually closed in the back by a hook and eye fastener, but smaller busted models may be fastened at the front. Sleep bras or athletic bras do not have fasteners and are pulled on over the head and breasts. The section between the cups is called a gore. The section under the armpit where the band joins the cups is called the "back wing".

Bra components, including the cup top and bottom (if seamed), the central, side and back panels, and straps, are cut to manufacturer's specifications. Many layers of fabric may be cut at the same time using computer-controlled lasers or bandsaw shearing devices. The pieces are assembled by piece workers using industrial sewing machines or automated machines. Coated metal hooks and eyes are sewn in by machine and heat processed or ironed into the back ends of the band and a tag or label is attached or printed onto the bra itself. The completed bras are folded (mechanically or manually), and packaged for shipment.

The chest band and cups, not the shoulder straps, are designed to support the weight of women's breasts. Strapless bras rely on an underwire and additional seaming and stiffening panels to support them. The shoulder straps of some sports bras cross over at the back to take the pressure off the shoulders when arms are raised. Manufacturers continually experiment with proprietary frame designs. For example, the Playtex "18-Hour Bra" model utilizes an M-Frame design.

=== Materials ===
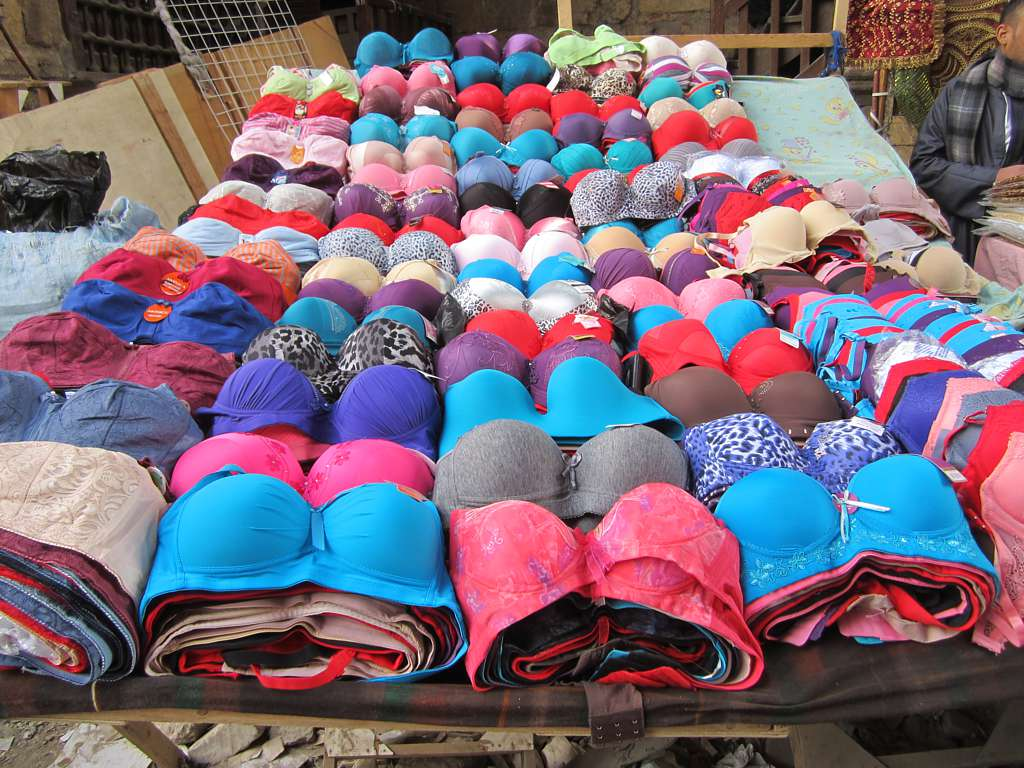
Selection of bras in Cairo, Egypt, 2013

Bras were originally made of linen, cotton broadcloth, and twill weaves and sewn using flat-felled or bias-tape seams. They are now made of a variety of materials, including Tricot, Spandex, Spanette, Latex, microfiber, satin, Jacquard, foam, mesh, and lace, which are blended to achieve specific purposes. Spandex, a synthetic fiber with built-in "stretch memory", can be blended with cotton, polyester, or nylon. Mesh is a high-tech synthetic composed of ultra-fine filaments that are tightly knit for smoothness.

Sixty to seventy per cent of bras sold in the UK and US have underwired cups. The underwire is made of metal, plastic, or resin. The antecedents for underwire in bras date to at least 1893, when Marie Tucek of New York City patented a breast supporter, a sort of early push-up bra made of either metal or cardboard and then covered with fabric. Underwire is built around the perimeter of the cup where it attaches to the band, increasing its rigidity to improve support, lift, and separation.

Wirefree or softcup bras have additional seaming and internal reinforcement.

By the late 1970s, wire-free bras were emerging both at Hanky Panky and at Hanro in Switzerland. Cosabella in Italy and in France followed in the 1980s, as did Eberjey in the 1990s. Others use padding or shaping materials to enhance bust size or cleavage.

=== Size and fitting ===
In most countries, bras come in a band and cup size, such as 34C; 34 is the chest band, or the measurement around the torso directly underneath the breasts, and C is the cup size, which refers to the volume of the breasts. Most bras are offered in 36 sizes; the Triumph "Doreen" comes in 67 sizes, up to 46J.

The cup size varies depending on the band size. A D cup on a 38 band is larger in volume than a D cup on a 34 band, as the volume of a woman's breast increases as her chest band dimension increases. Sister sizing works off this principle, meaning that women may find a better fit by moving up or down a band size whilst adjusting their cup size accordingly, as the sister size is a bra that shares the same cup volume as your usual size, despite having a different back and cup size. In countries that have adopted the European EN 13402 dress-size standard, the measurement is rounded to the nearest multiple of 5 centimetres (2.0 in).

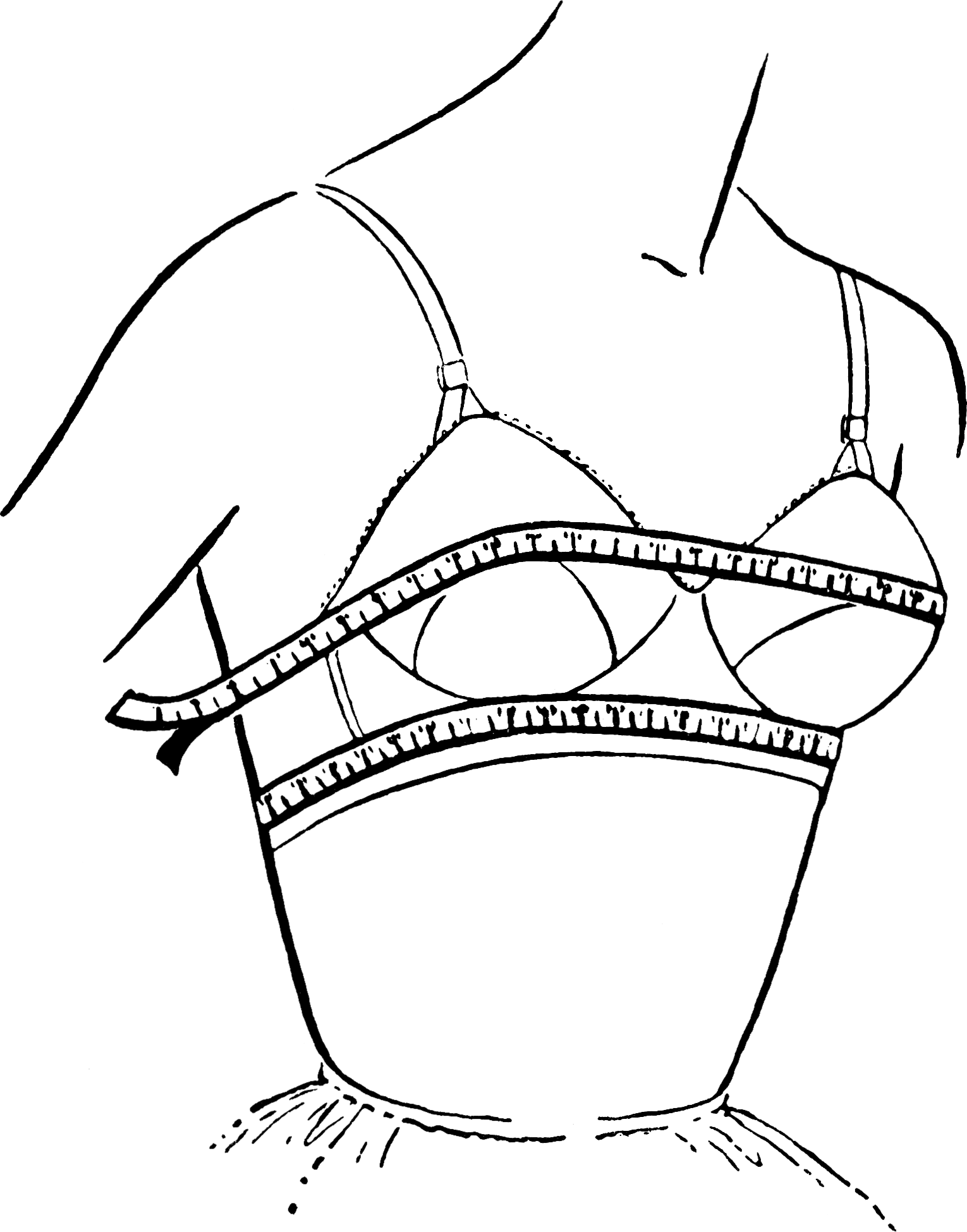
1958 illustration of how to measure cup and band size

International manufacturing standards and measurement systems vary widely. Bras are designed for an averaged body, but women's anatomy varies widely. Ten percent of women's breasts are asymmetrical, with the left breast being larger in 62 percent of cases. One woman's breasts may be ptotic and widely spaced, another's might be centered closely on the chest, upright, and very full. As a result, finding a correctly fitting bra is extremely difficult. When women find a bra that appears to fit, they tend to stay with that size, even though they may lose and gain weight.

In a survey in the United Kingdom, 60 per cent of over 2,000 women between the ages of 16 and 75 said they had had a bra fitting, and 99 per cent said that fit was the least important factor when selecting a bra. Increased publicity about the issue of poorly fitted bras has increased the number of women seeking a fitting. The UK retailer Marks & Spencer stated that about 8,000 women are fitted for bras in their stores weekly. Despite this, about 80–85 percent of women still wear the wrong bra size.

Bra experts recommend professional bra fittings from the lingerie department of a clothing store or a specialty lingerie store, especially for cup sizes D or larger, and particularly if there has been significant weight gain or loss, or if the wearer is continually adjusting her bra. Women in the UK change their bra size on average six times over their lifetimes.

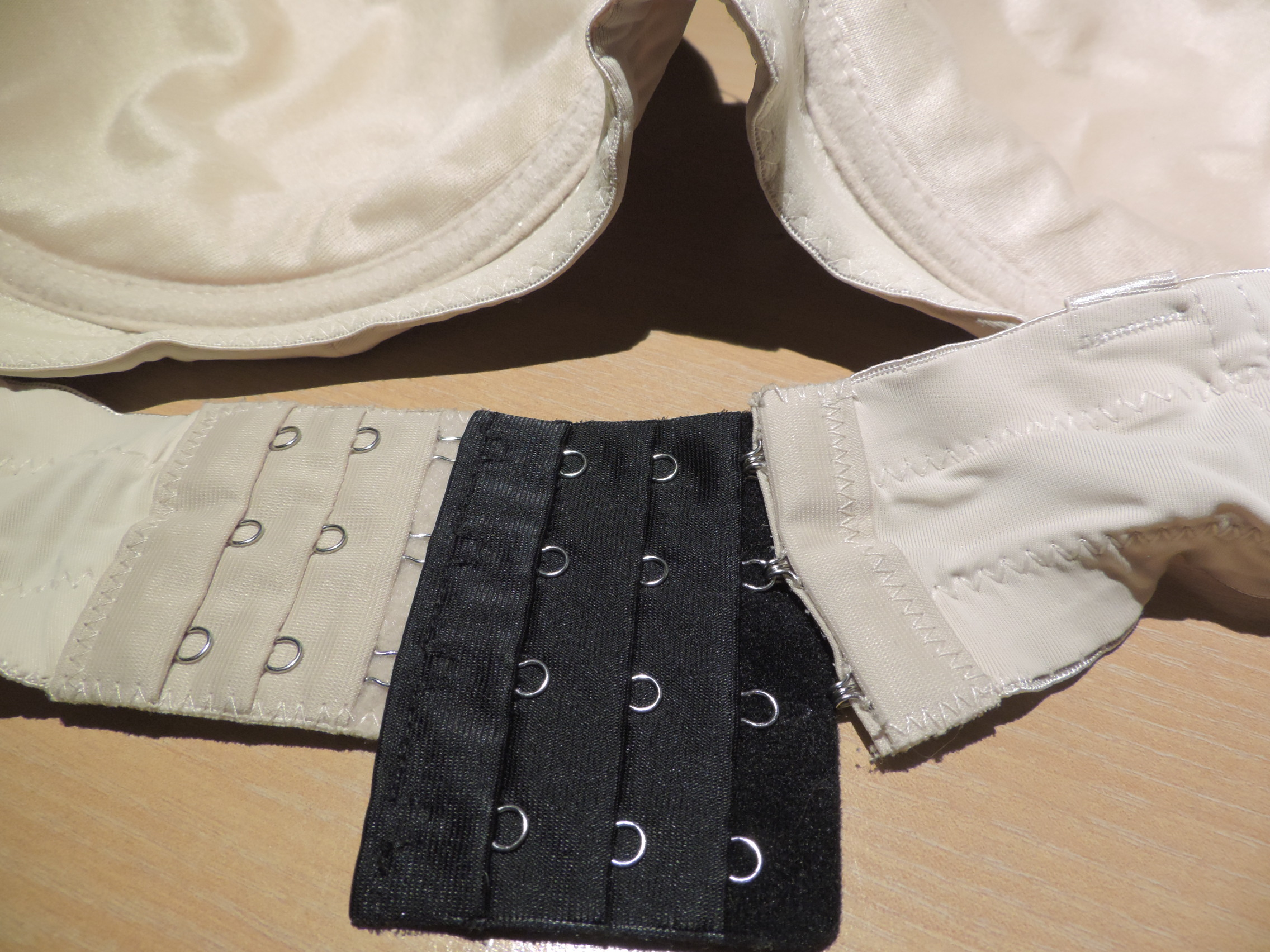
Bra extension for the band

Signs of a loose bra band include the band riding up the back. If the band causes flesh to spill over the edges, it is too small. A woman can test whether a bra band is too tight or loose by reversing the bra on her torso so that the cups are in the back and then check for fit and comfort. Experts suggest that women choose a band size that fits using the outermost set of hooks. This allows the wearer to use the tighter hooks as the bra stretches during its lifetime.

=== Styles ===
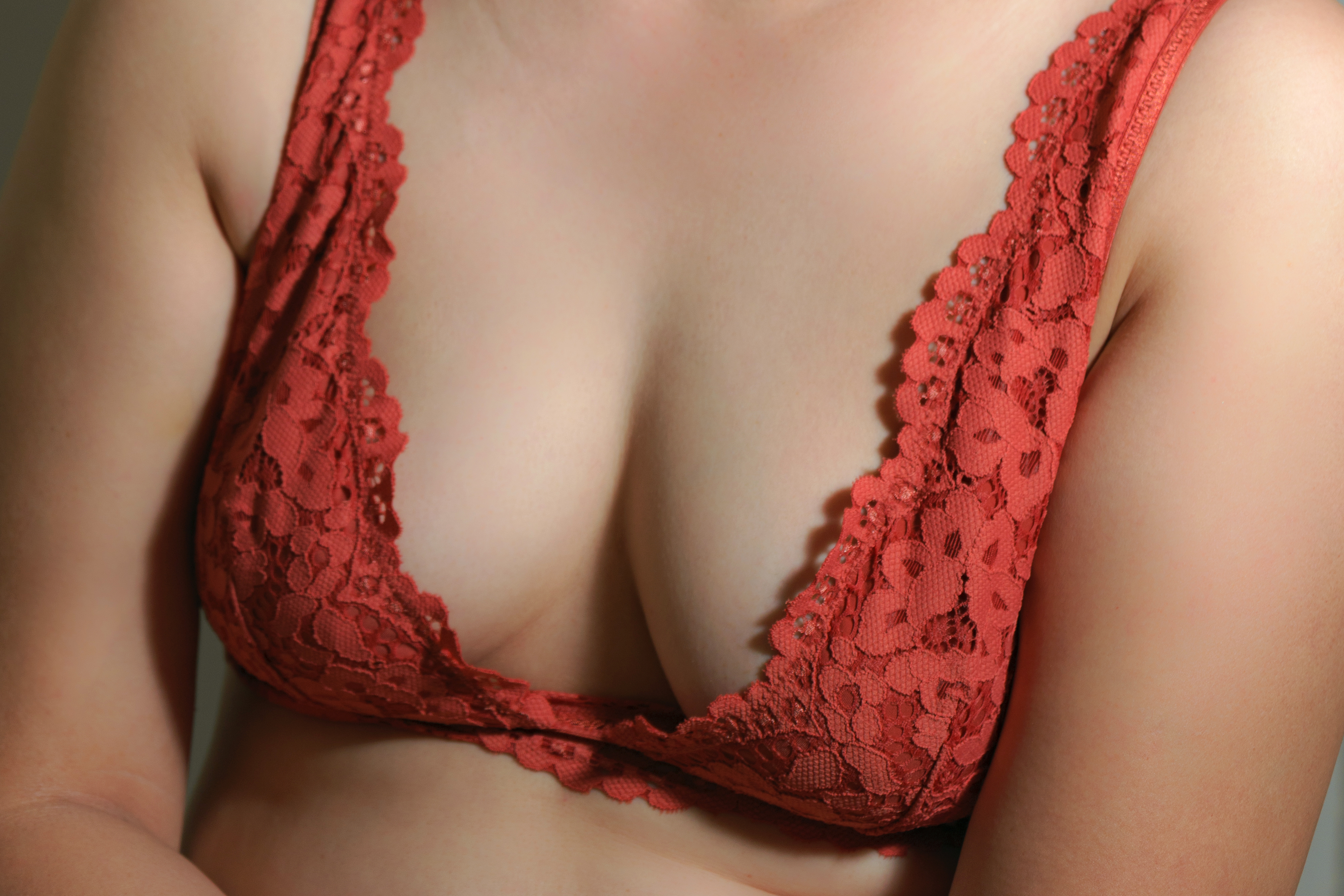
A bralette, a lighter and simpler form of a bra that offers less support and shaping but a more relaxed fit.

Bras may be designed to enhance a woman's breast size, or to create cleavage, or for other aesthetic, fashion, or more practical considerations. Nursing bras are designed to aid breastfeeding. Compression bras, such as sports bras, push against and minimize breast movement, whereas encapsulation bras have cups for support. Breast support may be built into some swimsuits, camisoles and dresses. Cancer bras are designed specifically for breast cancer patients who have undergone a mastectomy. The styles provide post-surgical support, and some include pads or pockets for stuffing.

Bras come in a variety of styles, including backless, balconette, convertible, shelf, full cup, full coverage bra, demi-cup, minimizing, padded, plunge, lounge bra, posture, push-up, racerback, sheer, strapless, T-shirt, underwire, unlined, and soft cup.

== Culture ==
=== Fashion ===
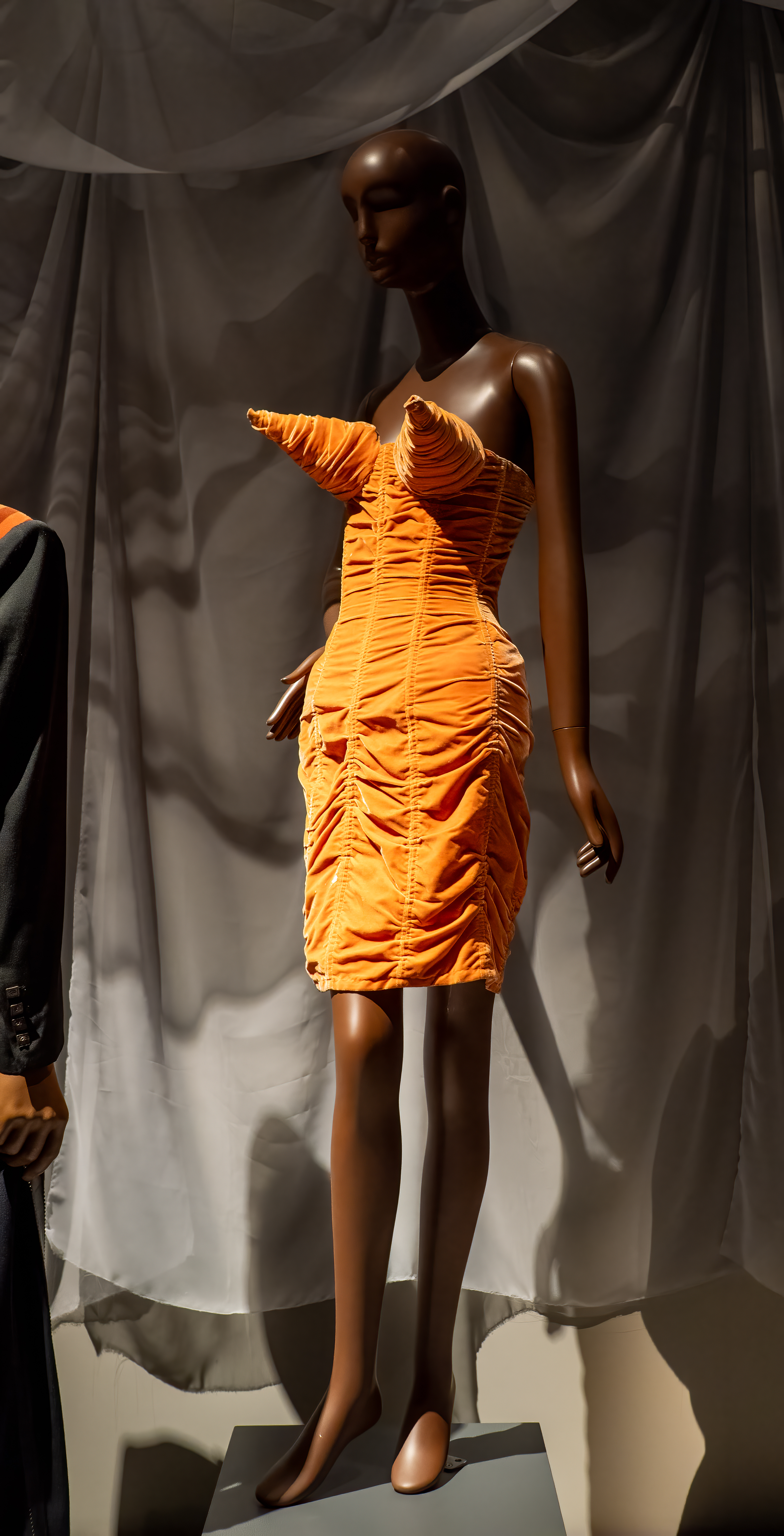
Cone-bra dress by Jean-Paul Gaultier

Women's choices about what bra to wear are consciously and unconsciously affected by social perceptions of the ideal female body shape, which changes over time. As lingerie, women wear bras for sex appeal. Bras can also be used to make a social statement as evidenced by Jean-Paul Gaultier's designs and the cone-shaped bra Madonna wore outside her clothing on her Blond Ambition World Tour.

In the 1920s, the flapper aesthetic involved flattening the breasts.

During the 1940s and 1950s, the sweater girl became fashionable, supported by a bullet bra (known also as a torpedo or cone bra) as worn by Jane Russell and Patti Page.

As outerwear, bras in the form of bikini tops in the 1950s became an acceptable public display. During the 1960s, designers and manufacturers introduced padded and underwire bras. After the Miss America protest in September 1968, manufacturers were concerned that women would stop wearing bras. In response, many altered their marketing and claimed that wearing their bra was like "not wearing a bra". In the 1970s women sought more comfortable and natural-looking bras.

In the late 1990s, larger breasts became more fashionable in England. Iris Marion Young described preferences in the United States in 1990: "round, sitting high on the chest, large but not bulbous, with the look of firmness." This is regarded as contradictory in several ways.

Victoria's Secret commissions a fantasy bra every autumn. In 2003, it hired the jeweller Mouawad to design one containing more than 2500 carats of diamonds and sapphires; valued at US$10 million, it was the world's most valuable bra at the time.

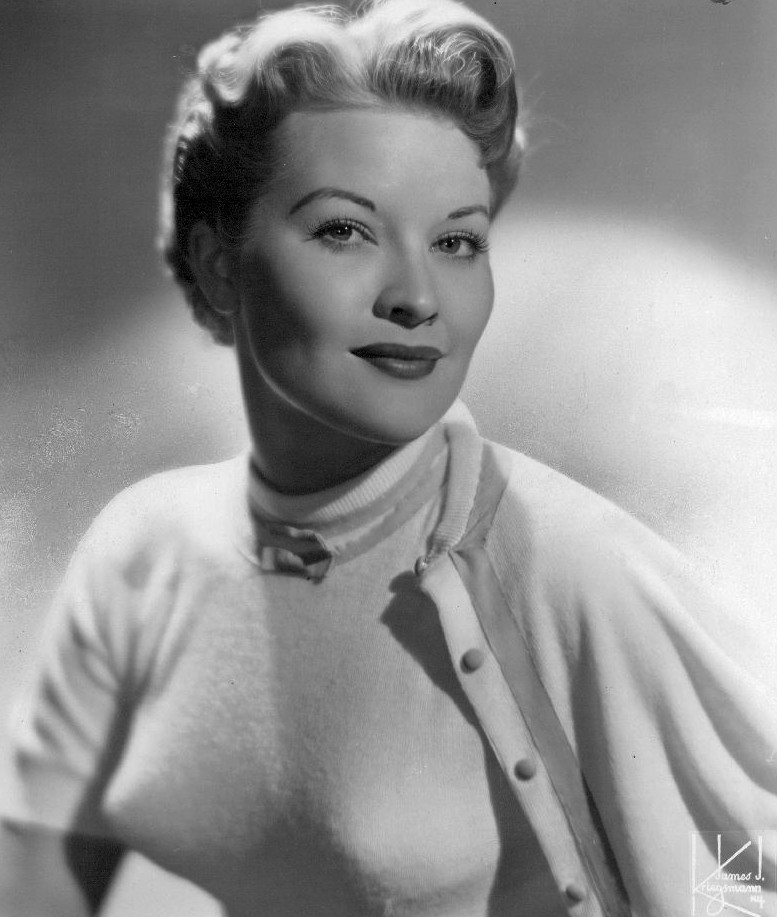
Patti Page wearing a bullet bra, 1955

=== Undergarment as outerwear ===
Sports bras were invented in 1975. Women wore them under other clothing for the next 25 years. But on 10 July 1999, Brandi Chastain scored the fifth kick in the penalty shootout to give the United States the win over China in the final game of the 1999 FIFA Women's World Cup Final. In celebration, she spontaneously whipped off her jersey, exposing her sports bra. Her act is regarded by some as a historical event that boosted wearing sports bras alone. From that point forward, sports bras were increasingly worn as outerwear.

Madonna was one of the first to start showing her bra straps, in the late 1980s. A corset she wore as outerwear during her 1990 Blond Ambition World Tour sold for US$52,000 in 2012 at the Christie's Pop Culture auction in London. Versace's autumn 2013 couture collection featured fashions that were open in the front, revealing underwire bras. It became fashionable from the early 1990s to wear clothing that showed bra straps.

Wearing clothes that reveal the bra or straps became so common that Cosmopolitan created guidelines in 2012 on how to expose them. Advice included avoiding plain, flesh-toned, smooth-cup bras, so that the exposure does not appear accidental; making sure the bra is in good condition; and wearing a style that either matches the colour of the outerwear or is dramatically different.

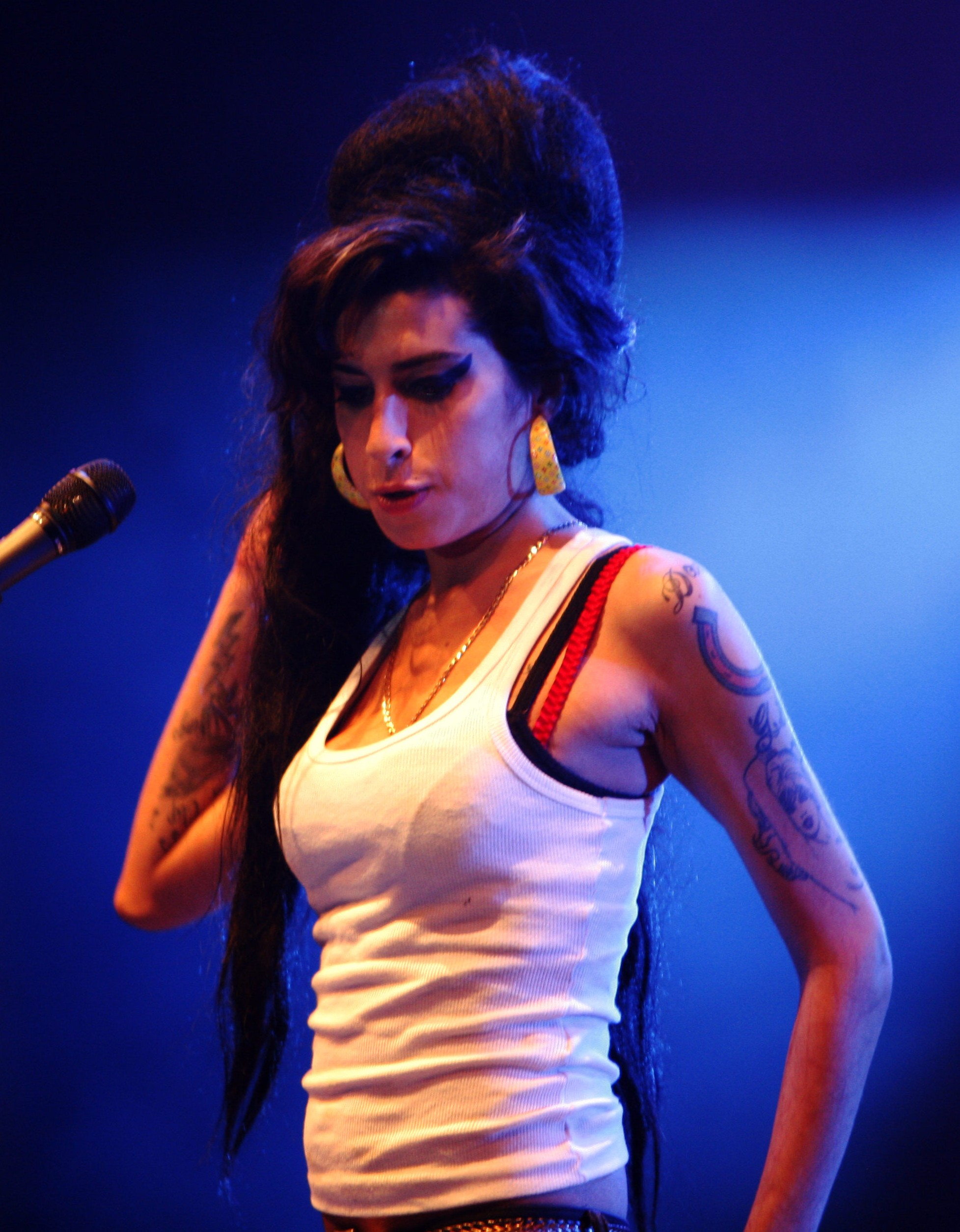
Amy Winehouse with a visible bra strap at a 2007 performance in France

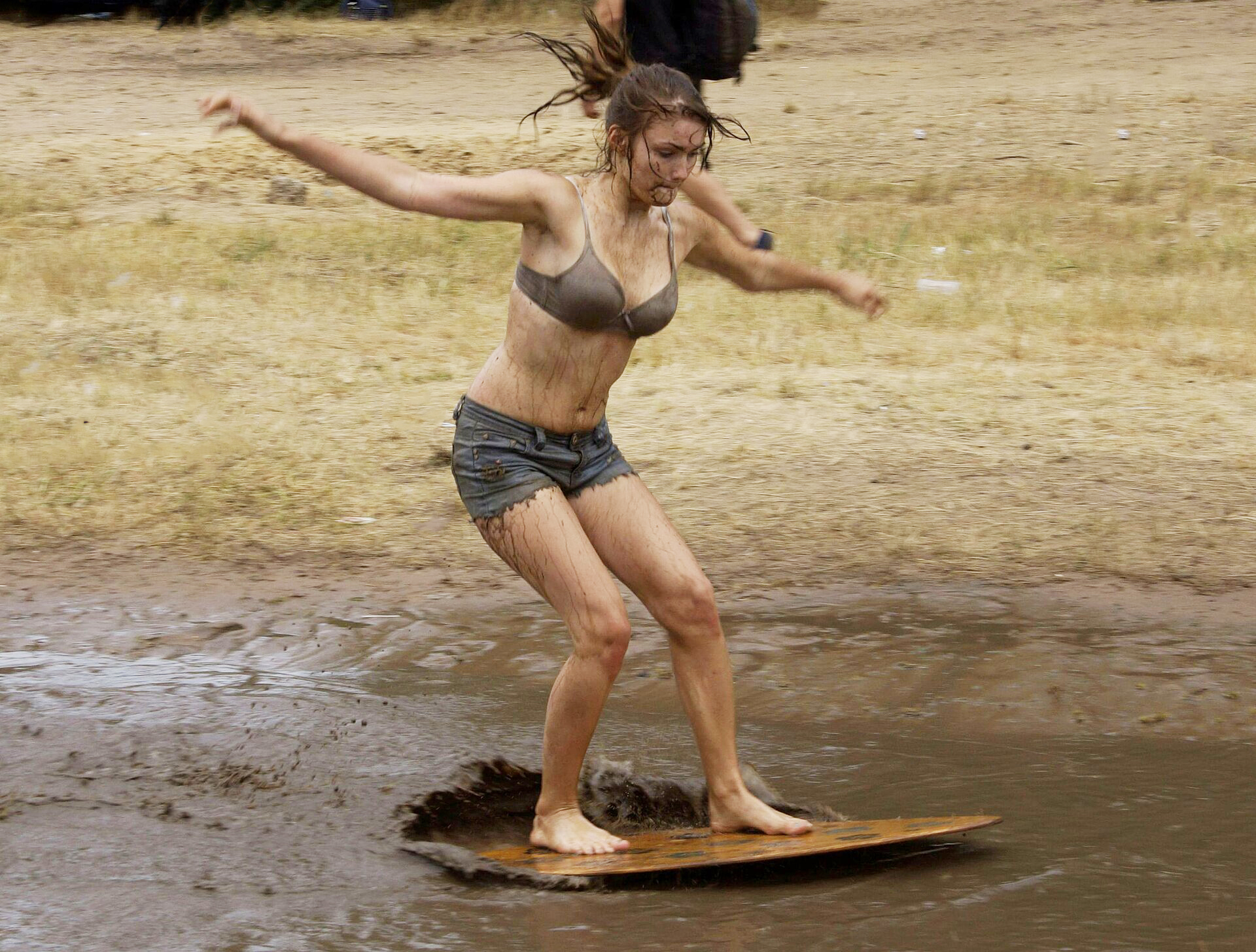
Woman wearing a bra as a top while skimboarding on mud at the 2011 Woodstock Festival in Poland

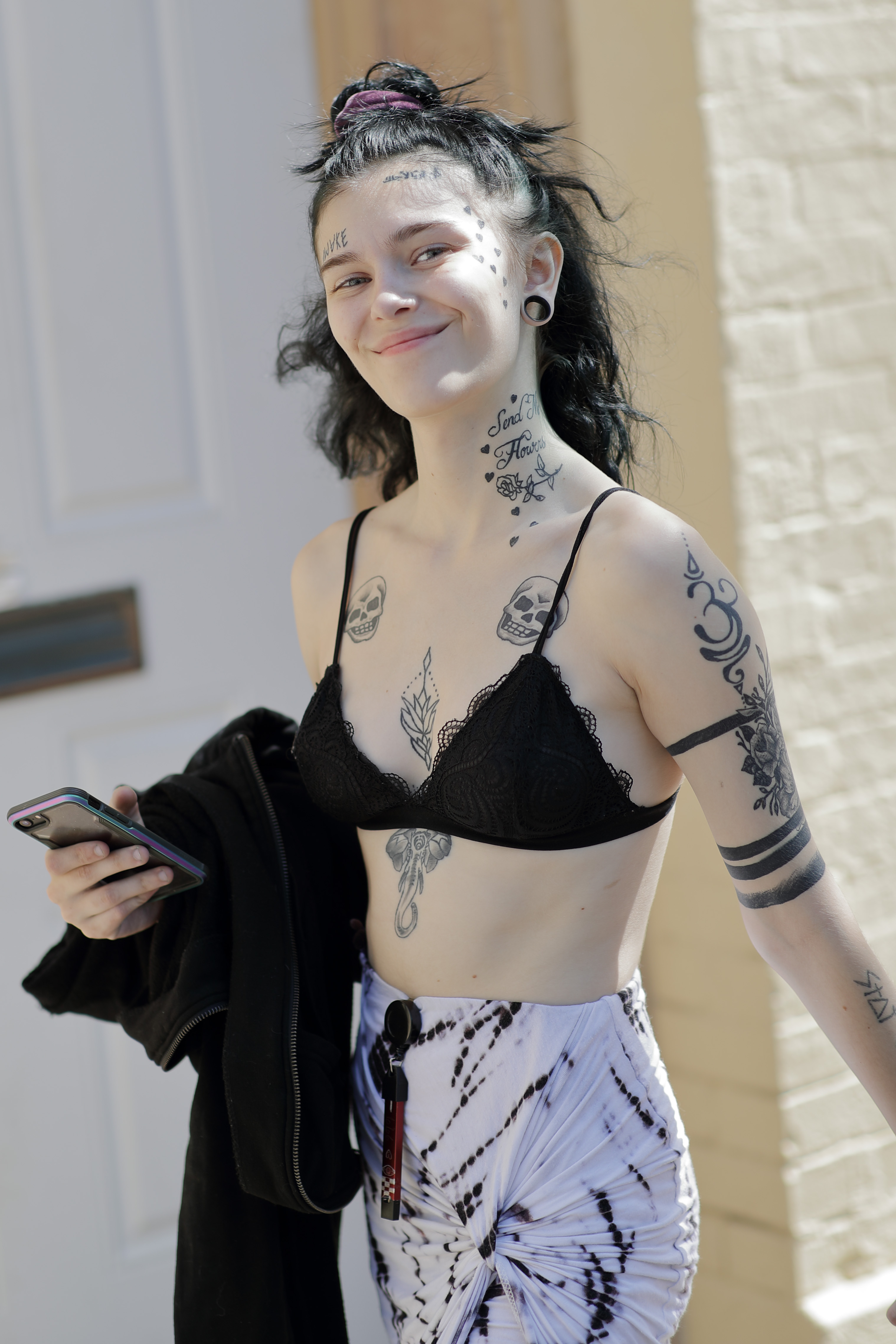
A black bralette, United States, 2019

=== Decreasing Western usage ===
While a few women have a medical and surgical need to wear a brassiere, informal surveys have found that many women began wearing bras to be fashionable, to conform to social or maternal pressure, or for physical support. Very few cited comfort as the reason. In fact, many women experience so much discomfort that they remove their bra as soon as they can.

In Western society, since the 1960s, there has been a slow but steady trend towards bralessness among a number of women, especially millennials, who have expressed opposition to and are giving up wearing bras. Being seen in public while not wearing a bra has become more acceptable since then, encouraging more women to go without. In 2016, Allure magazine fashion director Rachael Wang wrote, "Going braless is as old as feminism but it seems to be bubbling to the surface more recently as a direct response to Third Wave moments like #freethenipple hashtag campaign, increased trans-visibility like Caitlyn Jenner's Vanity Fair cover ... and Lena Dunham's show Girls (which features young women often without bras)."

In an online survey for All You magazine in 2013, 25 percent of women reported that they do not wear a bra every day. Surveys have reported that 5–25 per cent of Western women do not wear a bra. A National No Bra Day was first observed in the United States on 9 July 2011. Women posted on Twitter about the relief they felt when taking off their bra. More than 250,000 people expressed an interest in "attending" the day on a Facebook page. No Bra Day is now observed internationally on 13 October.

A Harris Poll commissioned by Playtex asked more than 1,000 women what they like in a bra. Among the respondents, 67 per cent said they prefer wearing a bra to going braless, while 85 per cent wanted to wear a "shape-enhancing bra that feels like nothing at all." They were split as regards underwire bras: 49 per cent said they prefer underwire bras, the same percentage as those who said they prefer wireless bras. According to underwire manufacturer S & S Industries of New York, who supply bras to Victoria's Secret, Bali, Warner's, Playtex, Vanity Fair, and other labels, about 70 per cent of bra-wearing women wear underwire bras.

COVID-19 lockdowns led to more women adopting wireless bras and bralettes for comfort. The company Knix, which manufactures exclusively soft-cup bras, reported a 100 percent increase in sales between January 2020 and January 2021. "I don't think women are going to want to go back to wearing their regular everyday bras," stated the chief product officer for Lululemon.

=== Usage in the developing world ===
Bras are not universally worn around the world; in some developing countries bras may cost up to 10–30 hours of a woman's wages, making them unaffordable to most of the population. As of 2011, women in Fiji needed to pay up to a week's wages for a new bra. Bras are highly prized at second-hand markets in West Africa. The Uplift Project provides recycled bras to women in developing countries. Since 2005 they have shipped 330,000, including to Fiji, Vanuatu, Tonga, and Cambodia.

In 2009 Somalia's hard-line Islamic group Al-Shabaab forced women to shake their breasts at gunpoint to see if they were wearing bras, which they called "un-Islamic". A resident of Mogadishu whose daughters were whipped said, "The Islamists say a woman's chest should be firm naturally, or flat."

=== Economic impact ===
Consumers spend around $16 billion a year worldwide on bras. In the US during 2012, women owned an average of nine bras and wore six on a regular basis. That increased from 2006, when the average American woman owned six, one of which was strapless, and one in a colour other than white. British women in a 2009 survey reported that they owned an average of 16 bras.

The average bra size among North American women has changed from 34B in 1983 to a 34DD in 2012–2013, and from 36C in 2013 to 36DD in the UK during 2014–2015. The change in bra size has been linked to growing obesity rates, breast implants, increased birth control usage, estrogen mimicking pollutants, the availability of a larger selection of bras, and women wearing better fitting bras.

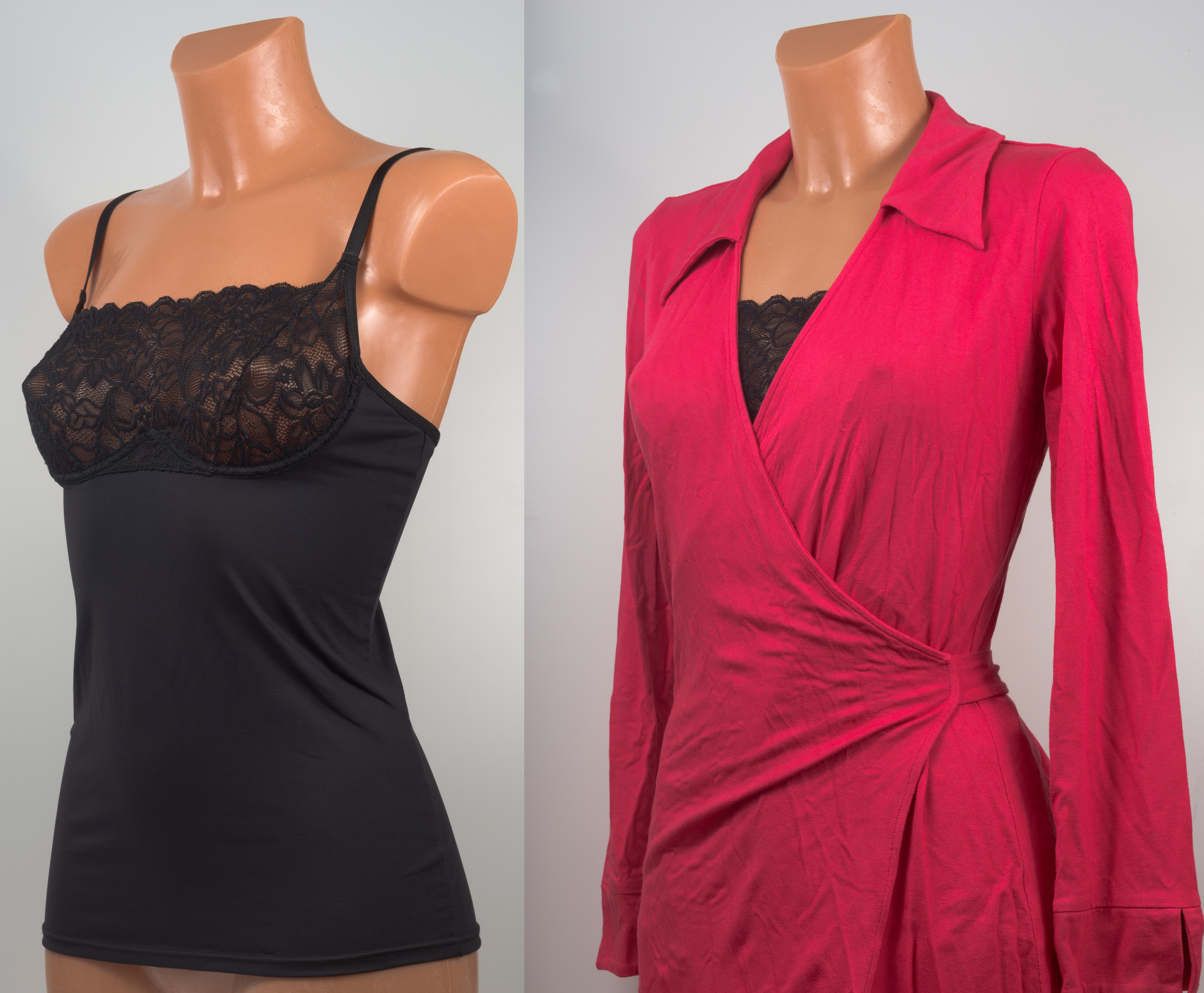
Bra shirt with built-in breast support (on left), 2015

Bras are made in Asian countries, including Sri Lanka, India, and China. While there has been some social pressure from the anti-sweatshop and anti-globalization movements on manufacturers to reduce use of sweatshop labour, most major apparel manufacturers rely on them directly and indirectly. Prior to 2005, a trade agreement limited textile imports to the European Union and the US. China was exporting US$33.9 billion in textiles and clothing each year to the EU and the US. When those quotas expired on 1 January 2005, the so-called Bra Wars began. Within six months, China shipped 30 million more bras to the two markets: 33 per cent more to the US and 63 per cent more to the EU. As of 2014, an average bra cost £29.80. As of 2012, Africa imported US$107 million worth of bras, with South Africa accounting for 40 per cent. Morocco was second and Nigeria third, while Mauritius topped purchasing on a per capita basis.

In countries where labour costs are low, bras that cost US$5–7 to manufacture sell for US$50 or more in American retail stores. As of 2006, female garment workers in Sri Lanka earned about US$2.20 per day. Similarly, Honduran garment factory workers in 2003 were paid US$0.24 for each $50 Sean John sweatshirt they made, less than one-half of one per cent of the retail price. In 2009, residents in the textile manufacturing city of Gurao in the Guangdong province of China made more than 200 million bras. Children were employed to assemble bras and were paid 0.30 yuan for every 100 bra straps they helped assemble. In one day they could earn 20 to 30 yuan.

=== Western feminist opinions ===
In 1968 at the feminist Miss America protest, protesters symbolically threw a number of feminine products into a "Freedom Trash Can". These included bras, which were among items the protesters called "instruments of female torture" and accoutrements of what they perceived to be enforced femininity. A local news story in the Atlantic City Press erroneously reported that "the bras, girdles, falsies, curlers, and copies of popular women's magazines burned in the 'Freedom Trash Can'". Individuals who were present said that no one burned a bra nor did anyone take off her bra. However, a female reporter (Lindsy Van Gelder) covering the protest drew an analogy between the feminist protesters and Vietnam War protesters who burned their draft cards, and the parallel between protesters burning their draft cards and women burning their bras was encouraged by some organizers including Robin Morgan. "The media picked up on the bra part", Carol Hanisch said later. "I often say that if they had called us 'girdle burners,' every woman in America would have run to join us."

Feminism and "bra-burning" became linked in popular culture. The analogous term jockstrap-burning has since been coined as a reference to masculism. While feminist women did not literally burn their bras, some stopped wearing them in protest. The feminist author Bonnie J. Dow has suggested that the association between feminism and bra-burning was encouraged by individuals who opposed the feminist movement. "Bra-burning" created an image that women were not really seeking freedom from sexism, but were attempting to assert themselves as sexual beings. This might lead individuals to believe, as Susan J. Douglas wrote, that the women were merely trying to be "trendy, and to attract men." Some feminist activists believe that anti-feminists use the bra burning myth and the subject of going braless to trivialize what the protesters were trying to accomplish at the feminist 1968 Miss America protest and the feminist movement in general.

The trope of feminists burning their bras was anticipated by an earlier generation of feminists who called for burning corsets as a step toward liberation. In 1873, American novelist Elizabeth Stuart Phelps Ward wrote:

So burn up the corsets! ... No, nor do you save the whalebones, you will never need whalebones again. Make a bonfire of the cruel steels that have lorded it over your thorax and abdomens for so many years and heave a sigh of relief, for your emancipation I assure you, from this moment has begun.

Some feminists began arguing in the 1960s and 1970s that the bra was an example of how women's clothing shaped and even deformed women's bodies to male expectations. In 1964, Professor Lisa Jardine described her dinner with Australian writer and public intellectual Germaine Greer during a formal college dinner in Newnham College, Cambridge:

At the graduates' table, Germaine was explaining that there could be no liberation for women, no matter how highly educated, as long as we were required to cram our breasts into bras constructed like mini-Vesuviuses, two stitched white cantilevered cones which bore no resemblance to the female anatomy. The willingly suffered discomfort of the Sixties bra, she opined vigorously, was a hideous symbol of female oppression.

Germaine Greer's book The Female Eunuch (1970) became associated with the anti-bra movement because she pointed out how restrictive and uncomfortable a bra could be. "Bras are a ludicrous invention," she wrote, "but if you make bralessness a rule, you're just subjecting yourself to yet another repression."

Susan Brownmiller in her book Femininity (1984) took the position that women without bras shock and anger men because men "implicitly think that they own breasts and that only they should remove bras."

The feminist author Iris Marion Young wrote in 2005 that the bra "serves as a barrier to touch" and that a braless woman is "deobjectified", eliminating the "hard, pointy look that phallic culture posits as the norm." Without a bra, in her view, women's breasts are not consistently shaped objects but change as the woman moves, reflecting the natural body. Other feminist anti-bra arguments from Young in 2005 include that training bras are used to indoctrinate girls into thinking about their breasts as sexual objects and to accentuate their sexuality. Young also wrote in 2007 that, in American culture, breasts are subject to "[c]apitalist, patriarchal American media-dominated culture [that] objectifies breasts before such a distancing glance that freezes and masters." The academic Wendy Burns-Ardolino wrote in 2007 that women's decision to wear bras is mediated by the "male gaze".

== Health ==
=== Fit ===
Doctors often recommend that women wear a well-fitted, supportive bra to help resolve the symptoms of fibrocystic breast changes.

=== Exercise ===
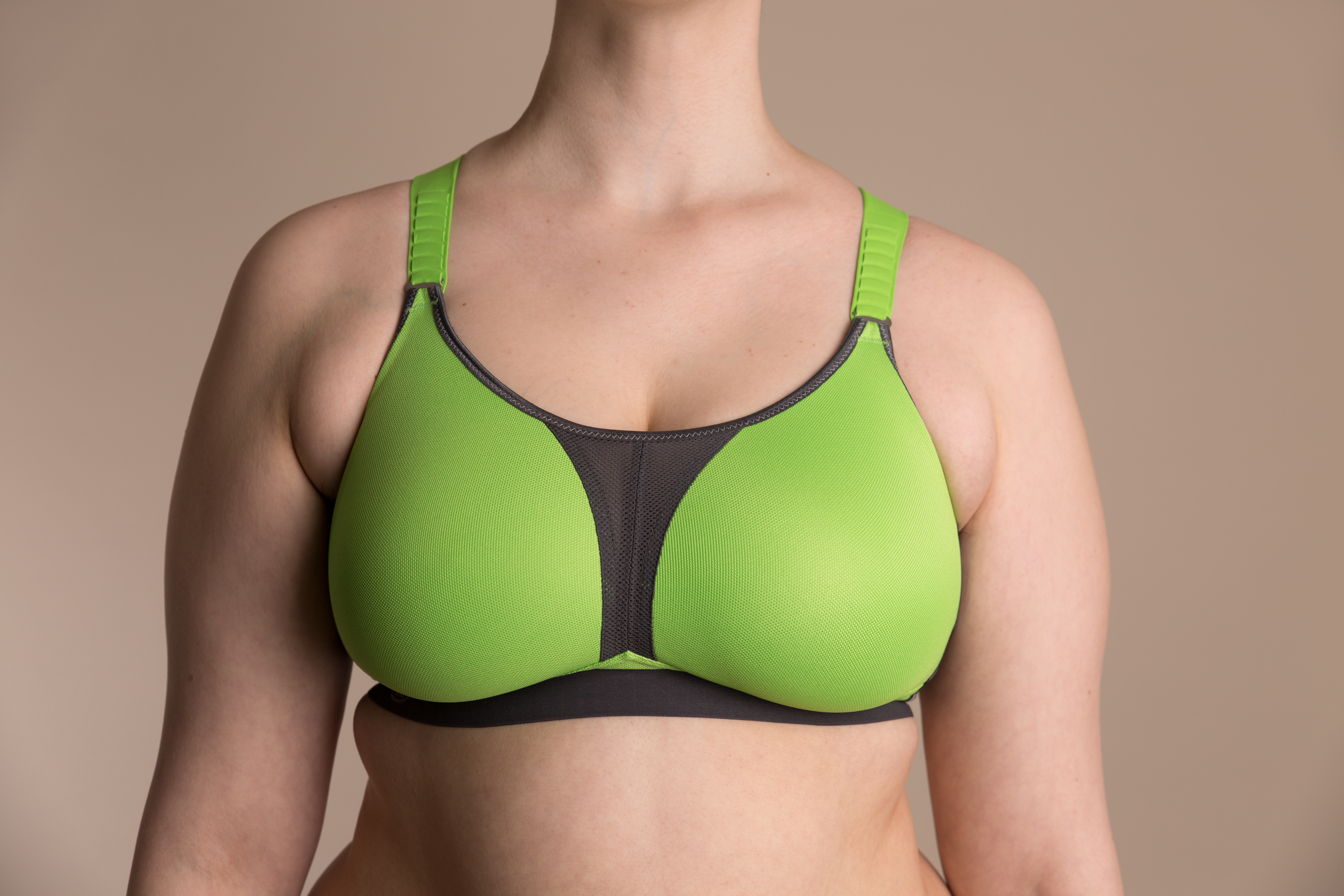
Sports bra

Biomechanical studies have demonstrated that, depending on the activity and the size of a woman's breast, when she walks or runs braless, her breasts may move up and down by 4 to 18 centimetres (1.6 to 7.1 in) or more, and also oscillate side to side.

Researchers have also found that as women's breast size increased, they took part in less physical activity, especially vigorous exercise. Few very-large-breasted women jogged, for example. To avoid exercise-related discomfort and pain, medical experts suggest women wear a well-fitted sports bra during activity.

=== Breast sagging ===
Women sometimes wear bras because they mistakenly believe they prevent breasts from sagging (ptosis) as they get older. Physicians, lingerie retailers, teenagers, and adult women used to believe that bras were medically required to support breasts. In a 1952 article in Parents' Magazine, Frank H. Crowell erroneously reported that it was important for teen girls to begin wearing bras early. According to Crowell, this would prevent sagging breasts, stretched blood vessels, and poor circulation later on.

A 2013 study by Jean-Denis Rouillon said that wearing a bra may actually weaken supportive tissue. However, this study was based on a small sample of approximately 300 subjects and was not published, nor peer reviewed, as of 2025. Dr. Rouillon also cautioned that avoiding the use of bras may not benefit all women, stating that: "But a middle-aged women, overweight, with 2.4 children? I'm not at all sure she'd benefit from abandoning bras".

Bra manufacturers are careful to claim that bras only affect the shape of breasts while they are being worn. The key factors influencing breast ptosis over a woman's lifetime are cigarette smoking, her number of pregnancies, gravity, higher body mass index, larger bra cup size, and significant weight gain and loss.

== The myth of bra burning ==
Traditionally, bra burning is a symbol of protest among radical left feminists in the 1960s and 1970s. The term was coined during a Miss America pageant in 1968 where a group of radical leftists protested that the view of women had become sexist. The protesters then threw away their accessories that were associated with the oppression of women. The things they threw away ranged from bras to false eyelashes. Occasional small groups of women burned their bras, but not on any large scale, and that it was a widespread factoid and was something that journalists constructed to get headlines. Reporters who wrote about bra burning possibly wanted to associate these actions with flag burning and draft burnings that occurred during this time on a more widespread scale. The call to "Burn your bra!" became an established expression of rebellion against the patriarchy.

== See also ==
- Bustier
- Basque (clothing)
- Handbra, covering the breasts with one's hands
- Male bra
- Pasties
