= Hello Molly =

Clothing retailer

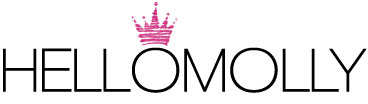
- Formerly: Hello Molly Fashion
- Type: Private
- Industry: E-commerce, Fashion, Clothing, Shoes
- Founded: 20 September 2012; 13 years ago
- Headquarters: Sydney, Australia
- Products: Dresses; Rompers; Tops; Bottoms; Accessories; Swimwear
- Website: hellomolly.com

Hello Molly is an Australian women's clothing retailer that sells online. The company has headquarters in Sydney, Australia and offices in Los Angeles and Beijing.

== History ==
Hello Molly was founded in 2012 by Echo Liu (CEO) when she was a student at the University of Sydney. She was supported by a small founding team including Ena Hadziselimovic. An initial investment of ~AU$50,000 led to modest early revenues, growing from AU$510,100 in the first year to AU$5.3 million by 2014. By 2021, the brand had surpassed AU$100 million in annual revenue.

Known for its fast and feminine fashion, Hello Molly releases over 100 new styles each week to reflect a wide range of styles and identities. Originally focused on partywear, the brand has expanded into categories including swimwear (launching Hello Molly Swim in 2018), occasion wear (through its in-house collection Dear Emilia, launched in 2017), and bridal-inspired fashion. In 2025, Hello Molly launched its Wedding Parlour collection, offering modern bridal looks, bridesmaid dresses, and event-ready styles tailored to the wedding season.

In December 2016, Hello Molly launched its travel-inspired sister brand, Fortunate One, catering to free-spirited, adventure-loving customers with a boho aesthetic.

== In popular culture ==
Hello Molly released its first TV commercial in May, 2018 during the show Love Island.

Hello Molly was mentioned in a feature dubbed 'online shopping night cheat sheet' along with other retailers in Vogue Australia in April 2018. Similarly in June 2018 a Hello Molly jumpsuit was featured in a Glamour (magazine) article about wedding-guest attire.
