= Lastex =

Type of elastic yarn

Lastex is a type of elastic yarn that was introduced in the 1930s and was primarily used for swimwear, brassieres, girdles and corselettes. It consists of a rubber core surrounded by wool, rayon, silk or cotton threads. It was invented and distributed by the Adamson Brothers, a company owned by the US Rubber Company. It entered the market in 1931.
