= Herminie Cadolle =

French Communard, businesswoman and corsetière

- Born: 1845
- Died: 1926 (aged 80–81)
- Known for: French inventor of the modern bra

Herminie Cadolle (1845–1926) was a French inventor of the modern bra and founder of the Cadolle Lingerie House.

== Early life ==
Herminie Cadolle was born, raised, and lived much of her early life in France. She was a close friend of the insurrectionist Louise Michel, who participated in the Paris Commune of 1871. Fearing state repression after the murderous defeat of the Commune uprising, Cadolle and her family fled for safety to Buenos Aires, Argentina.

== Career ==
In 1887, while she was in Argentina, it marked the start of her entrepreneurial journey. Supported by her husband and son, Alcide, she opened the first "House of Cadolle," quickly building a fortune through her made-to-measure lingerie business. In 1889, Cadolle returned to Paris where she opened a similar lingerie workshop. There, she invented a two-piece undergarment. The lower part was a hybrid-corset for the waist and the upper supported the breasts by means of shoulder straps. A patent for the invention was filed in 1889. The invention, called the "corselet-gorge," was revolutionary, as it literally split the traditional corset in two to provide more comfort. Early sketches show it was initially attached to the corset, but even that small change helped pave the way for bras as we know them. Cadolle exhibited her invention at the Exposition Universelle (1900) and by 1905 the upper half was being sold separately as modern-day bras.

Corsets had been briefly unpopular during the French Revolution of 1789, when they were associated with the aristocracy, but soon they returned to prominence as the political mood settled again. From the middle of the 19th century, gradually, the corset came under more and more criticism. Advocates for women’s rights, like Cadolle, and physicians highlighted its role in causing physical discomfort and health complications. Despite her innovation, the bra struggled to gain popularity at first. The fashion of the late 19th century still favored tiny waists, which required full corsets. It wasn’t until World War I, when women entered factories and prioritized practicality over aesthetics, that the bra became widely accepted. Cadolle continued to work into the 1920s. Her efforts were spurred by the First World War, which saw women enter the factories when male workers left for war. Comfort rather than beauty was crucial, so the corset was out and the bra was in. Cadolle’s innovation and different variations of it are still dominant in female undergarments, as is the desire for women’s rights and the rebellion against adherence to societal norms and the ideal image of a woman’s body.

Cadolle became a fitter of bras to queens, princesses, dancers, and actresses. Mata Hari was among her customers. Her work also served as a foundation for collaborations with haute couture houses.

== Legacy ==
By 1911, Cadolle’s daughter Marie moved the business to Rue Cambon, where the shop shared proximity with luxury brands like Chanel and Hermès. This established Cadolle as a cornerstone of Parisian fashion. She was also the first to use cloth incorporating rubber (elastic) thread. Cadolle’s business is still run by her descendants today.
