= Bralette =

Lightweight bra without an underwire

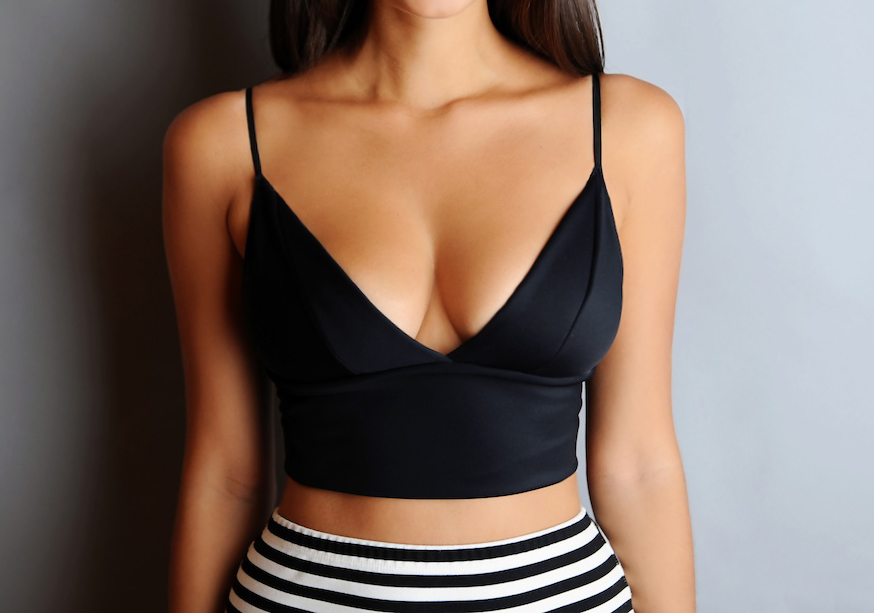
A black satin bralette

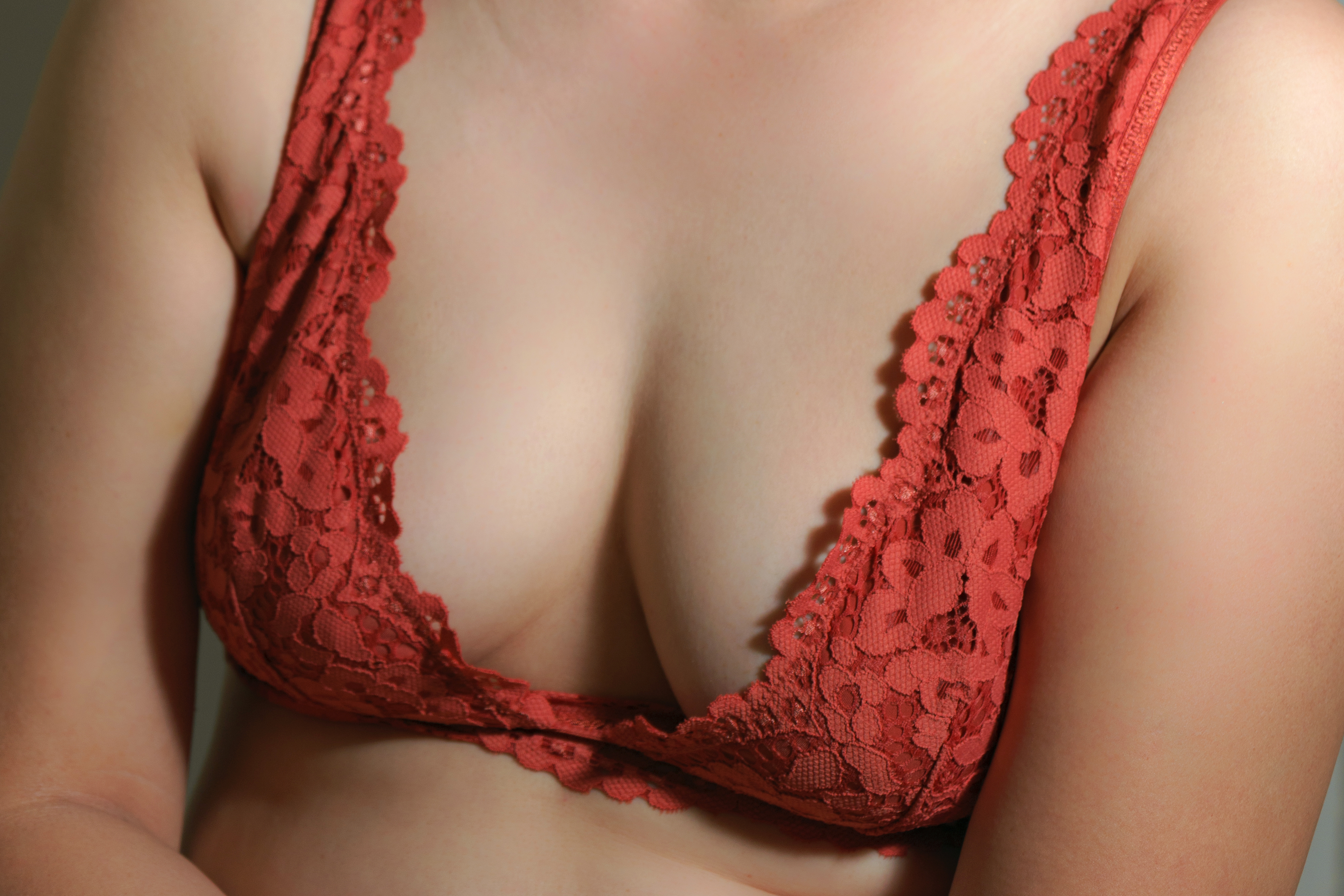
A bralette by Victoria’s Secret

A bralette is a lightweight bra without an underwire, designed primarily for comfort. Bralettes are also sometimes worn as outerwear top, and are also designed as undershirts for girls developing breasts. The size of the bralette also differs from that of a bra: Instead of band width and cup size, normal clothing sizes are commonly used (S-XL or even larger).

== Popularity ==
In the 2010s and early 2020s, bralettes and soft bras started gaining in popularity, at the expense of underwired and padded bras. Some brands such as Victoria's Secret failed to follow this trend and adjust, as a result of which their sales decreased significantly. In 2017, the sales of cleavage-enhancing bras fell by 45% while, at Marks & Spencer, sales of wireless bras grew by 40%. Some have attributed the rising popularity of bralettes to a new focus on the "athletic body, health and wellbeing", more than "about the male gaze," while others suggest a connection to the #MeToo movement.

Bralettes also became popular during the COVID-19 lockdowns due to a focus on comfort while remote working.

== See also ==
- Camisole
- Bralessness
- Sleeveless shirt
