= National Cleavage Day =

Annual celebration in South Africa

National Cleavage Day (abbreviated NCD) was an annual celebration held in South Africa, sponsored by the brassiere marketer Wonderbra. National Cleavage Day was started in 2002 and held at the end of every December. Wonderbra together with Cosmopolitan magazine and 5fm, an SABC radio station mainly based in Johannesburg, sponsored the celebration.

== Purpose ==
Anita Meiring, public relations consultant for Wonderbra, described the event: "It is a day for women to realise that their cleavage is something unique and that they should be proud of it." "It gives women a chance to be beautiful and glow in the furtive, yet appreciative, glances their cleavage evokes from men". She also explained, "It gives men a legitimate reason to stare at boobs."

Samantha Paterson, a brand manager for Wonderbra, said that National Cleavage Day was started as a way to solemnise women's independence and power in all facets of life, from their careers to their relationships to their own destiny. Paterson said the day is intended to be lighthearted amusement and that the revenue would be donated to the Sunflower Fund. The fund, a non-governmental and non-profit organisation based in Cape Town with a stated aim to help South African citizens diagnosed with leukaemia and other life-threatening blood diseases, has since combined with the German-based NGO DKMS to form DKMS Africa.

== Locations ==
National Cleavage Day was celebrated at office premises, restaurants and bars throughout the nation. Most people polled on the streets during the celebrations in 2002 expressed a positive view of the event. During National Cleavage Day 2002, twenty local girls in Johannesburg and another twenty girls in Cape Town distributed stickers and G-strings to selected female drivers. The celebration of the NCD in 2006 started early in the morning of 7 April when women showing their cleavages in Edgars, Foschini Group and Truworths at La Lucia Mall, Gateway Theatre of Shopping and The Pavilion handed out free copies of Cosmopolitan magazine to customers. A competition was organised at the Cafe Vacca Matta called the "Best Cleavage." Thousands of women in the province of KwaZulu-Natal displayed their cleavages in support of this event. Local manufacturers and retailers of undergarments joined in support of the celebration of the NCD and it marked changes in the industry.

After the celebration in 2007, Paterson said, "We will be donating money for every bra that gets sold in March. We will donate money to the Sunflower fund. We are having big parties, we have special National Cleavage Day cocktails that have been created and for every cocktail bought R2 will be donated to the sunflower fund."

References to National Cleavage Day, observed annually in March or April, were occasionally noted internationally as trending on Twitter.

== Criticism ==
Siqwana-Ndulo, provincial gender commissioner in Eastern Cape, condemned the celebrations, warning women not to be involved in the National Cleavage Day. Siqwana-Ndulo said "This is a pure marketing tool using people's bodies." She added, "The commission is against any person or advertising company, which uses people's bodies for marketing purposes be it advertising a car or anything of that sort."

A paper published by Gender Links depicted an image of two women showing their cleavages during the NCD on 5 April 2003, with the caption "These two bosom buddies were all part of the fun in yesterday’s National Cleavage Day, where a number of stunning beauties, their natural assets enhanced by Wonderbra, brought traffic to a standstill in many parts of Joburg." The paper argued that globalisation of the media enforces "globalised norms" of gender and the lowest single common denominator in "global" images of gender is "sex sells" which builds and reinforces stereotypes and biases—both male and female. Vanessa Raphaely, editor of the Cosmopolitan, argued the NCD is not intended to objectify women, but to celebrate in a funny manner.
