= All You =

US magazine

- Editor: Clare McHugh
- Frequency: Monthly
- Total circulation: 1,560,503 (2013)
- First issue: August 2004
- Final issue: December 2015
- Company: Time Inc.
- Country: United States
- Based in: New York, New York
- Language: English
- Website: www.allyou.com
- ISSN: 1550-6924

All You was an American women’s monthly magazine published by Time Inc. and sold at Walmart, Sam's Club and via subscription. The magazine was first published in August 2004.

All You focused on value: Each story offered money-saving and/or time-saving tips, and the magazine developed a community of Reality Checkers, thousands of women who contribute ideas and tips that appear on many of their pages. All You ceased publication after the December 2015 issue.

== Target audience ==
All You was targeted toward the average female Walmart customer and featured models wearing clothing sold within the store. It also contained stories featuring what the magazine considers "real women" who are diverse in age, appearance, background and culture.

== Value ==
All You included a large number of coupons, and even includes an index to help navigate through them. A weekly emailed newsletter titled All You Deals and Meals was available from the magazine which offers subscribers a preview of coupons available in future magazines.

Themed events were held in Walmart stores across the United States where "brand ambassadors" from the magazine act as "personal shoppers" to assist customers shopping for value. These events were sponsored by the magazine's advertisers. The magazine also sponsored other events aimed at helping modern women.
