= Top (clothing) =

Clothing worn on the upper body

A top, or topwear, is an item of clothing that covers at least the chest, but which usually covers most of the upper human body between the neck and the waistline. The bottom of tops can be as short as mid-torso, or as long as mid-thigh. Men's tops are generally paired with pants, and women's with pants or skirts. Common types of tops are t-shirts, blouses and shirts.

== History ==
T-shaped upper body garments have existed since antiquity in the form of tunics. T-shirts are thought to be derived from the one-piece union suit worn in the 19th century. To increase comfort, workers cut apart the top and bottom of the union suit. After World War II, T-shirts became somewhat acceptable as outerwear for men working on farms and road crews.

By the 1890s, most American women had a shirtwaist blouse.

== Design ==
The neckline is the highest line of the top, and may be as high as a head-covering hood, or as low as the waistline or bottom hem of the top. A top may be worn loose or tight around the bust or waist, and may have sleeves or shoulder straps, spaghetti straps (noodle straps), or may be strapless. The back may be covered or bare. Tops may have straps around the waist or neck, or over the shoulders.

== Types ==
Picture	Type	Description
	T-shirt	with sleeve, either half or full.
	Tank top	sleeveless, with spaghetti straps.
	Crop top	lo-rise hip-hugger jeans, exposing belly.
	Tube top	no sleeve, no strap over shoulder, just wraps around bust.
	Jean top	A top made out of denim fabrics.

== Neck styles ==
Picture	Type	Description
	Halter top	single strap around neck.
	Turtleneck	A top with close-fitting, round, and high collar that folds over and covers the neck.

== See also ==
- Bralette
- Corset
- Toplessness
