= Frederick Mellinger =

German actor

- Born: 15 November 1890; Berlin, German Empire
- Died: 29 August 1970 (aged 79); Bad Wiessee, Bavaria, West Germany
- Occupation: Actor
- Years active: 1939–1940

Frederick Mellinger (15 November 1890 – 29 August 1970) was a German actor.

== Filmography ==
- Hitler – Beast of Berlin (1939)
- The Hunchback of Notre Dame (1939)
- Dr. Ehrlich's Magic Bullet (1940)
- A Dispatch from Reuters (1940)
