= Bra size =

Measures to determine proper bra fit

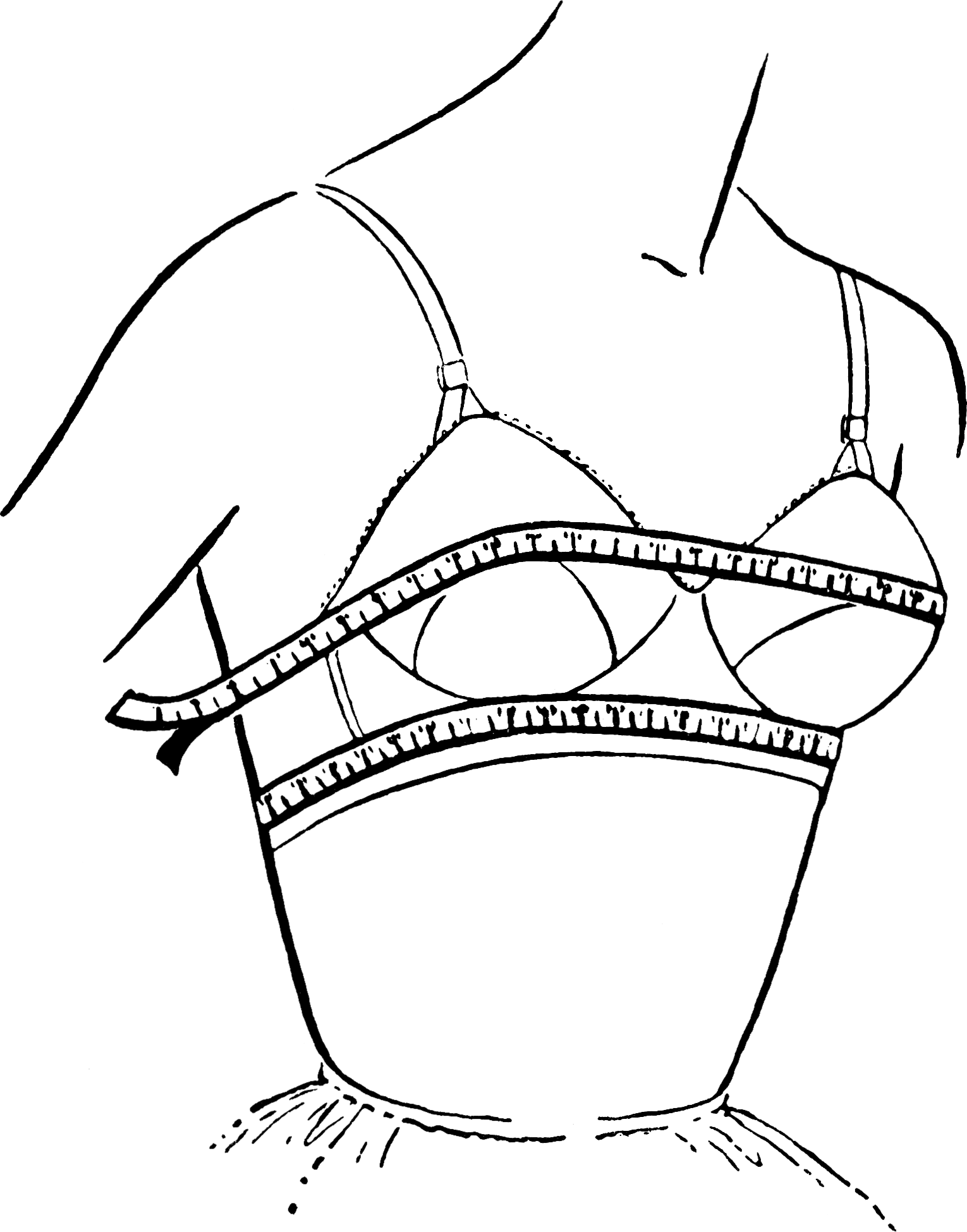
Measuring for bra size: around the torso at the inframammary fold and over the bust

Bra size (also known as brassiere measurement or bust size) indicates the characteristics of a bra to accurately fit the breasts. While there are multiple bra sizing systems in use around the world, the bra size usually consists of a number indicating the size of the band around the torso, and one or more letters that indicate the breast cup size. Bra cup sizes were invented in 1932 while band sizes became popular in the 1940s. For convenience, because of the impracticality of determining the dimensions of each breast, the volume of the bra cup, or cup size, is based on the difference between band length and over-the-bust measurement.

Manufacturers try to design and manufacture bras that correctly fit the majority of wearers, while individuals try to identify correctly fitting bras among different styles and sizing systems.

Manufacturers' bra size labelling systems vary by country because no comprehensive international standards exist. Even within a country, one study found that the bra size label was consistently different from the measured size. As a result of all these factors, about 25% of bra-wearing people have a difficult time finding a properly fitted bra, and some choose to buy custom-made bras due to the unique shape of their breasts.

== Measurement method origins ==
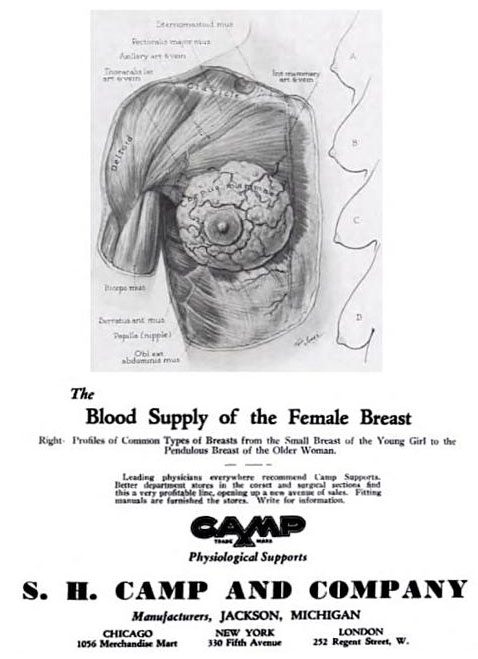
1932 advertisement by S.H. Camp and Company, the first to correlate A-to-D cup size with the volume of the breast

On 21 November 1911, Parisienne Madeleine Gabeau received a United States patent for a brassiere with soft cups and a metal band that supported and separated the breasts. To avoid the prevailing fashion that created a single "monobosom", her design provided: "...that the edges of the material d may be carried close along the inner and under contours of the breasts, so as to preserve their form, I employ an outlining band of metal b which is bent to conform to the lower curves of the breast."

=== Cup design origins ===
The term "cup" was not used to describe bras until 1916 when two patents were filed.

In October 1932, S.H. Camp and Company was the first to use letters of the alphabet (A, B, C and D) to indicate cup size, although the letters represented how pendulous the breasts were and not their volume. Camp's advertising in the February 1933 issue of Corset and Underwear Review featured letter-labeled profiles of breasts. Cup sizes A to D were not intended to be used for larger-breasted women.

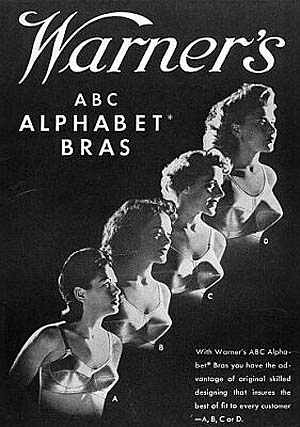
Warner's 1944 advertisement for its Alphabet Bras in cup sizes A to D

In 1935, Warner's introduced its Alphabet Bra with cup sizes from size A to size D. Their bras incorporated breast volume into its sizing, and continues to be the system in use. Before long, these cup sizes got nicknames: egg cup, tea cup, coffee cup and challenge cup, respectively. Two other companies, Model and Fay-Miss (renamed in 1935 as the Bali Brassiere Company), followed, offering A, B, C and D cup sizes in the late 1930s. Catalogue companies continued to use the designations Small, Medium and Large through the 1940s. Britain did not adopt the American cups in 1933, and resisted using cup sizes for its products until 1948. The Sears Company finally applied cup sizes to bras in its catalogue in the 1950s.

However, though various manufacturers used the same descriptions of bra sizes (e.g., A to D, small large, etc.), there was no standardisation of what these descriptions actually measured, so that each company had its own standards.

=== Band measurement origins ===
Multiple hook and eye closures were introduced in the 1930s that enabled adjustment of bands. Prior to the widespread use of bras, the undergarment of choice for Western women was a corset. To help women meet the perceived ideal female body shape, corset and girdle manufacturers used a calculation called hip spring, the difference between waist and hip measurement (usually 10–12 inches (25–30 cm)).

The band measurement system was created by U.S. bra manufacturers just after World War II.

=== Other innovations ===
The underwire was first added to a strapless bra in 1937 by André, a custom-bra firm. Patents for underwire-type devices in bras were issued in 1931 and 1932, but were not widely adopted by manufacturers until after World War II when metal shortages eased.

In the 1930s, Dunlop chemists were able to reliably transform rubber latex into elastic thread. After 1940, "whirlpool", or concentric stitching, was used to shape the cup structure of some designs. The synthetic fibres were quickly adopted by the industry because of their easy-care properties. Since a brassiere must be laundered frequently, easy-care fabric was in great demand.

== Consumer fitting ==
For best results, the breasts should be measured twice: once when standing upright, once bending over at the waist with the breasts hanging down. If the difference between these two measurements is more than 10 cm, then the average is chosen for calculating the cup size. A number of reports, surveys and studies in different countries have found that between 80% and 85% of women wear incorrectly fitted bras.

In November 2005, Oprah Winfrey produced a show devoted to bras and bra sizes, during which she talked about research that eight out of ten women wear the wrong size bra.

=== Larger breasts and bra fit ===
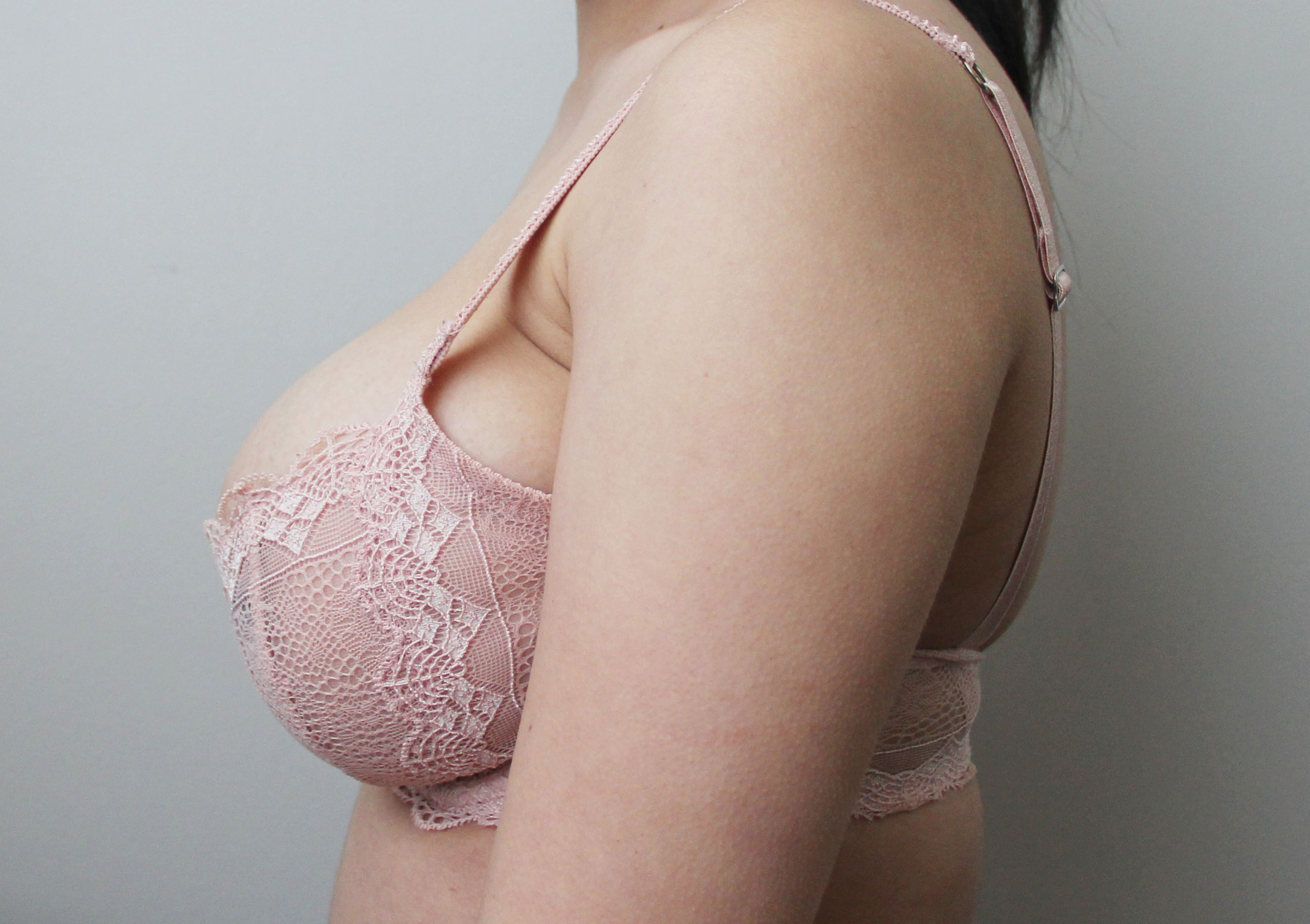
A woman wearing bra size 30E exhibits correct band fit (30) with a cup fit (E) that is too small.

Studies have revealed that the most common mistake made by women when selecting a bra was to choose too large a back band and too small a cup, for example, 38C instead of 34E, or 34B instead of 30D.

The heavier a person's build, the more difficult it is to obtain accurate measurements, as measuring tape sinks into the flesh more easily.

In a study conducted in the United Kingdom of 103 women seeking mammoplasty, researchers found a strong link between obesity and inaccurate back measurement. They concluded that "obesity, breast hypertrophy, fashion and bra-fitting practices combine to make those women who most need supportive bras the least likely to get accurately fitted bras."

One issue that complicates finding a correctly fitting bra is that band and cup sizes are not standardized, but vary considerably from one manufacturer to another, resulting in sizes that only provide an approximate fit. Women cannot rely on labeled bra sizes to identify a bra that fits properly. Scientific studies show that the system of bra sizing as of 2007 may be inaccurate.

Manufacturers cut their bras differently, so, for example, two 34B bras from two companies may not fit the same person. Customers should pay attention to which sizing system is used by the manufacturer. The main difference is in how cup sizes increase, by 2 cm or 1 inch (= 2.54 cm, see below). Some French manufacturers also increase cup sizes by 3 cm. Unlike dress sizes, manufacturers do not agree on a single standard.

British bras range from A to LL cup size (with Rigby&Peller recently introducing bras by Elila which go up to US-N-Cup), while most Americans can find bras with cup sizes ranging from A to G. Some brands (Goddess, Elila) go as high as N, a size roughly equal to a British JJ-Cup. In continental Europe, Milena Lingerie from Poland produces up to cup R. Larger sizes are usually harder to find in retail outlets. As the cup size increases, the labeled cup size of different manufacturers' bras tend to vary more widely in actual volume. One study found that the label size was consistently different from the measured size.

Even medical studies have attested to the difficulty of getting a correct fit. Research by plastic surgeons has suggested that bra size is imprecise because breast volume is not calculated accurately:

The current popular system of determining bra size is inaccurate so often as to be useless. Add to this the many different styles of bras and the lack of standardization between brands, and one can see why finding a comfortable, well-fitting bra is more a matter of educated guesswork, trial, and error than of precise measurements.

The use of the cup sizing and band measurement systems has evolved over time and continues to change. Experts recommend that women get fitted by an experienced person at a retailer offering the widest possible selection of bra sizes and brands.

=== Bad bra-fit symptoms ===
If the straps dig into the shoulder, leaving red marks or causing shoulder or neck pain, the bra band is not offering enough support. If breast tissue overflows the bottom of the bra, under the armpit, or over the top edge of the bra cup, the cup size is too small. Loose fabric in the bra cup indicates the cup size is too big. If the underwires poke the breast under the armpit or if the bra's center panel does not lie flat against the sternum, the cup size is too small. If the band rides up the torso at the back, the band size is too big. If it digs into the flesh, causing the flesh to spill over the edges of the band, the band is too small. If the band feels tight, this may be due to the cups being too small; instead of going up in band size a person should try going up in cup size. Similarly a band might feel too loose if the cup is too big. It is possible to test whether a bra band is too tight or too loose by reversing the bra on her torso so that the cups are at the back and then check for fit and comfort. Generally, if the wearer must continually adjust the bra or experiences general discomfort, the bra is a poor fit and she should get a new fitting.

=== Obtaining best fit ===
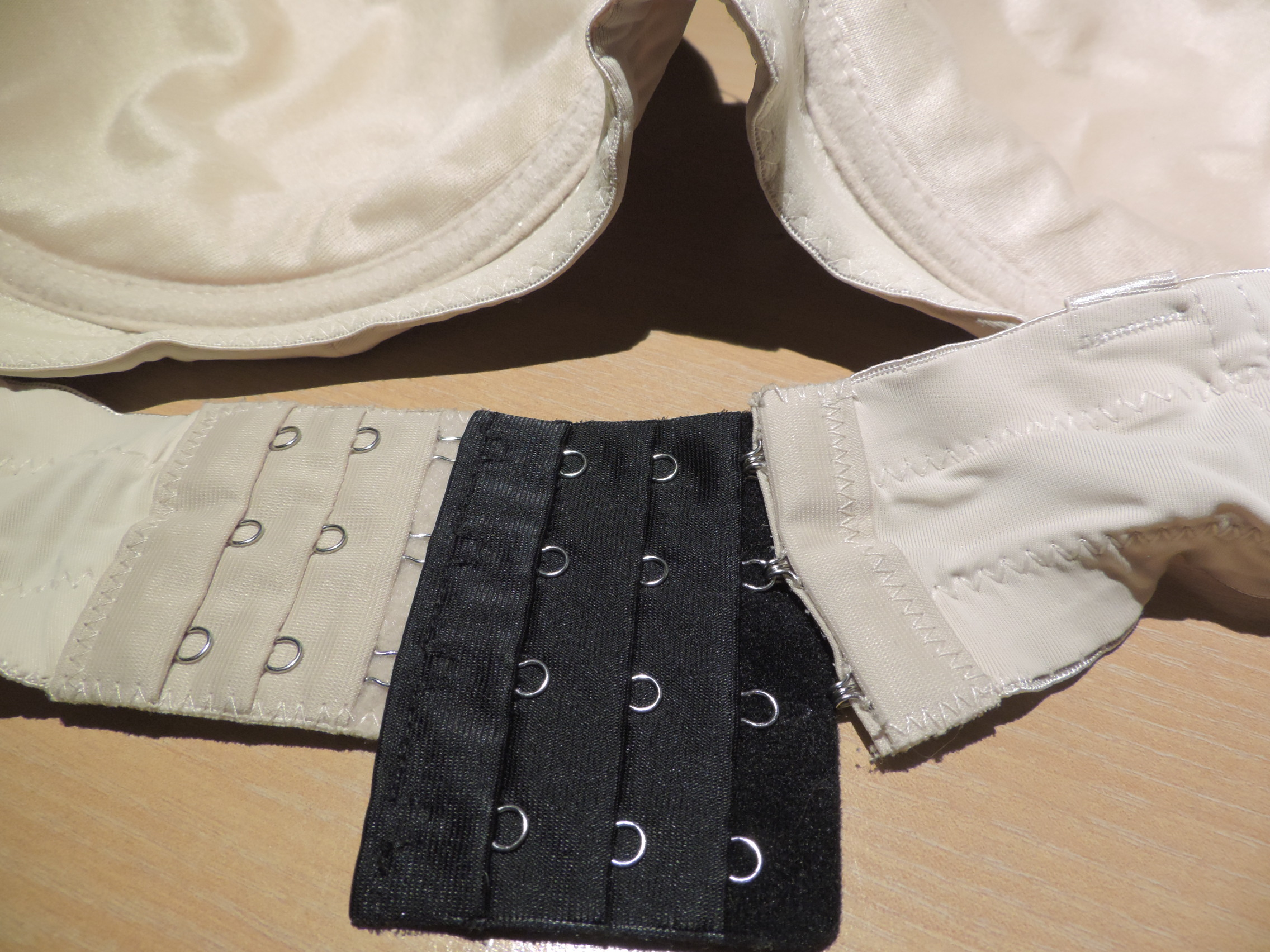
Bra extension for the band

Bra experts recommend that women, especially those whose cup sizes are D or larger, get a professional bra fitting from the lingerie department of a clothing store or a specialty lingerie store. However, even professional bra fitters in different countries including New Zealand and the United Kingdom produce inconsistent measurements of the same person. There is significant heterogeneity in breast shape, density, and volume. As such, existing methods of bra fitting may be insufficient for this range of chest morphology.

A 2004 study by Consumers Reports in New Zealand found that 80% of department store bra fittings resulted in a poor fit. However, because manufacturer's standards widely vary, women cannot rely on their own measurements to obtain a satisfactory fit. Some bra manufacturers and distributors state that trying on and learning to recognize a properly fitting bra is the best way to determine a correct bra size, much like shoes.

A correctly fitting bra should meet these criteria:

- When viewed from the side, the edge of the chest band should be horizontal, should not ride up the back and should be firm but comfortable.
- Each cup's underwire at the front should lie flat against the sternum (not the breast), along the inframammary fold, and should not dig into the chest or the breasts, rub or poke out at the front.
- The breasts should be enclosed by the cups and there should be a smooth line where the fabric at the top of the cup ends.
- The apex of the breast, the nipple, must be in the center of the cup.
- The breast should not bulge over the top or out the sides of the cups, even with a low-cut style such as the balconette bra.
- The straps of a correctly fitted bra should not dig into or slip off the shoulder, which suggests a too-large band.
- The back of the bra should not ride up and the chest band should remain parallel to the floor when viewed from the back.
- The breasts should be supported primarily by the band around the rib cage, rather than by the shoulder straps.
- The woman should be able to breathe and move easily without the bra slipping around.

=== Confirming bra fit ===
One method to confirm that the bra is the best fit has been nicknamed the Swoop and Scoop. After identifying a well-fitting bra, the woman bends forward (the swoop), allowing her breasts to fall into the bra, filling the cup naturally, and then fastening the bra on the outermost set of hooks. When the woman stands up, she uses the opposite hand to place each breast gently into the cup (the scoop), and she then runs her index finger along the inside top edge of the bra cup to make sure her breast tissue does not spill over the edges.

Experts suggest that women choose a bra band that fits well on the outermost hooks. This allows the wearer to use the tighter hooks on the bra strap as it stretches during its lifetime of about eight months. The band should be tight enough to support the bust, but the straps should not provide the primary support.

== Consumer measurement difficulties ==
A bra is one of the most complicated articles of clothing to make. A typical bra design has between 20 and 48 parts, including the band, hooks, cups, lining, and straps. Major retailers place orders from manufacturers in batches of 10,000. Orders of this size require a large-scale operation to manage the cutting, sewing and packing required.

Constructing a properly fitting brassiere is difficult. Adelle Kirk, formerly a manager at the global Kurt Salmon management consulting firm that specializes in the apparel and retail businesses, said that making bras is complex:

Bras are one of the most complex pieces of apparel. There are lots of different styles, and each style has a dozen different sizes, and within that there are a lot of colors. Furthermore, there is a lot of product engineering. You've got hooks, you've got straps, there are usually two parts to every cup, and each requires a heavy amount of sewing. It is very component intensive.

=== Asymmetric breasts ===
Obtaining the correct size is complicated by the fact that up to 25% of women's breasts display a persistent, visible breast asymmetry, which is defined as differing in size by at least one cup size. For about 5% to 10% of women, their breasts are severely different, with the left breast being larger in 62% of cases. Minor asymmetry may be resolved by wearing a padded bra, but severe cases of developmental breast deformity — commonly called "Amazon's Syndrome" by physicians — may require corrective surgery due to morphological alterations caused by variations in shape, volume, position of the breasts relative to the inframammary fold, the position of the nipple-areola complex on the chest, or both.

=== Breast volume variation ===
Obtaining the correct size is further complicated by the fact that the size and shape of women's breasts change, if they experience menstrual cycles, during the cycle and can experience unusual or unexpectedly rapid growth in size due to pregnancy, weight gain or loss, or medical conditions. Even breathing can substantially alter the measurements.

Some women's breasts can change shape by as much as 20% per month:

"Breasts change shape quite consistently on a month-to-month basis, but they will individually change their volume by a different amount ... Some girls will change less than 10% and other girls can change by as much as 20%." Would it be better not to wear a bra at all then? "... In fact there are very few advantages in wearing existing bras. Having a bra that's generally supportive would have significant improvement particularly in terms of stopping them going south ...The skin is what gives the breasts their support."

=== Increases in average bra size ===
In 2010, the most common bra size sold in the UK was 36D. In 2004, market research company Mintel reported that bust sizes in the United Kingdom had increased from 1998 to 2004 in younger as well as older consumers, while a more recent study showed that the most often sold bra size in the US in 2008 was 36D.

Researchers ruled out increases in population weight as the explanation and suggested it was instead likely due to more women wearing the correct, larger size.

== Consumer measurement methods ==
Bra retailers recommend several methods for measuring band and cup size. These are based on two primary methods, either under the bust or over the bust, and sometimes both. Calculating the correct bra band size is complicated by a variety of factors. The American National Standards Institute states that while a voluntary consensus of sizes exists, there is much confusion to the 'true' size of clothing. As a result, bra measurement can be considered an art and a science. Online shopping and in-person bra shopping experiences may differ because online recommendations are based on averages and in-person shopping can be completely personalized so the shopper may easily try on band sizes above and below her between measured band size. For the woman with a large cup size and a between band size, they may find their cup size is not available in local stores so may have to shop online where most large cup sizes are readily available on certain sites. Others recommend rounding to the nearest whole number.

=== Band measurement methods ===
There are several possible methods for measuring the bust.

==== Underbust +0 ====
A measuring tape is pulled around the torso at the inframammary fold. The tape is then pulled tight while remaining horizontal and parallel to the floor. The measurement (in inches) is then rounded to the nearest even number for the band size. As of March 2018, Kohl's uses this method for its online fitting guide.

==== Underbust +4 ====
This method begins the same way as the underbust +0 method, where a measuring tape is pulled tight around the torso under the bust while remaining horizontal. If the measurement (in inches) is even, 4 is added to calculate the band size. If it is odd, 5 is added. Kohl's used this method in 2013. The "war on plus four" was a name given to a campaign (circa 2011) against this method, with underbust +0 supporters claiming that the then-ubiquitous +4 method fails to fit a majority of women. Underbust +4 method generally only applies to the US and UK sizes.

==== Sizing chart ====
Many large U.S. department stores determine band size by starting with the measurement taken underneath the bust similar to the aforementioned underbust +0 and underbust +4 methods. A sizing chart or calculator then uses this measurement to determine the band size. Band sizes calculated using this method vary between manufacturers.

==== Underarm/upper bust ====
A measuring tape is pulled around the torso under the armpit and above the bust. Because band sizes are most commonly manufactured in even numbers, the wearer must round to the closest even number.

=== Cup measurement methods ===
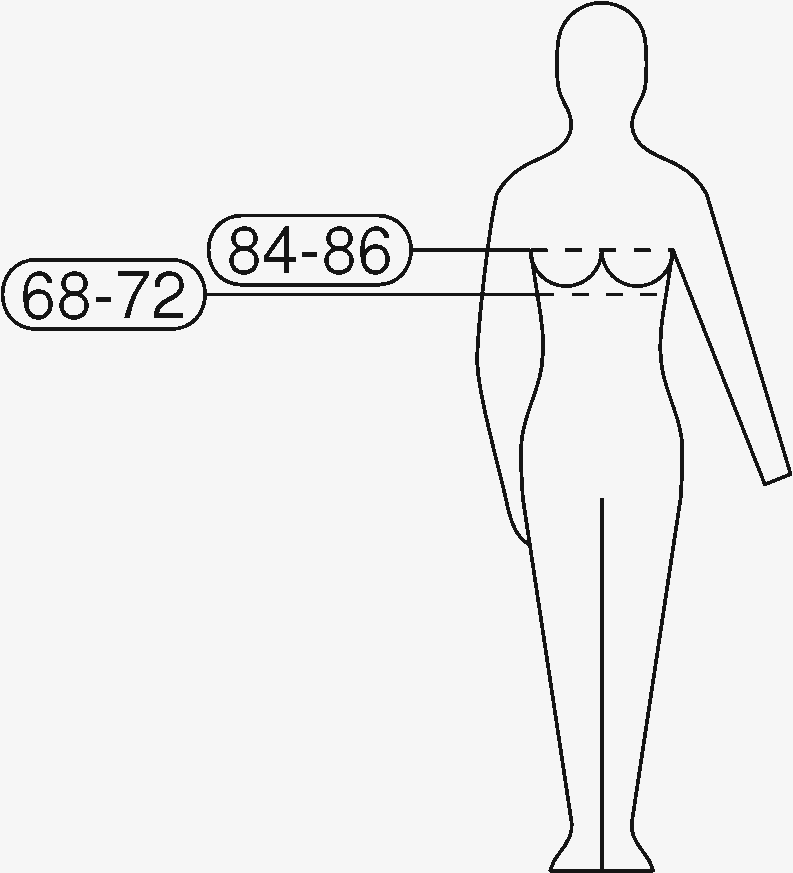
Pictogram for the European bra size 70B using EN 13402-1

The cup size is found by taking the difference between the bust size and the band size. The bust size, bust line measure, or over-bust measure is the measurement around the torso over the fullest part of the breasts, with the crest of the breast halfway between the elbow and shoulder, usually over the nipples, ideally while standing straight with arms to the side and wearing a properly fitted bra, because this practice assumes the bra fits correctly. The measurements are made in the same units as the band size, either inches or centimetres. The cup size is calculated by subtracting the band size from the over-the-bust measurement.

=== The meaning of cup sizes varies ===
Cup sizes vary from one country to another. For example, a U.S. H-cup does not have the same size as an Australian, even though both are based on measurements in inches. The larger the cup size, the bigger the variation.

Over the bust/band measurement difference and cup size
| Difference (inches) | | <1 | 1 | 2 | 3 | 4 | 5 | 6 | 7 | 8 | 9 | 10 | 11 | 12 | 13 | 14 | 15 | 16 | 17 | 18 | |
| Cupsize | U.S. | AA | A | B | C | D | DD/E | DDD/F | DDDD/G | H | I | J | K | L | M | N | O | P | Q | R | |
| Cupsize | Austr. | AA | A | B | C | D | DD | E | F | G | H | I | J | K | L | M | N | O | P | | |
| Cupsize | UK | AA | A | B | C | D | DD | E | F | FF | G | GG | H | HH | J | JJ | K | KK | L | LL | M |

Surveys of bra sizes tend to be very dependent on the population studied and how it was obtained. For instance, one U.S. study reported that the most common size was 34B, followed by 34C, with 63% size 34, and 39% cup size B. That survey sample was drawn from 103 Caucasian student volunteers at a Midwest U.S. university aged 18–25, excluding pregnant and nursing women.

Triumph survey
| Country | D | C | B | A |
|---|---|---|---|---|
| UK | 57% | 18% | 19% | 6% |
| Denmark | 50% | 19% | 24% | 7% |
| Netherlands | 36% | 27% | 29% | 8% |
| Belgium | 28% | 28% | 35% | 9% |
| France | 26% | 29% | 38% | 7% |
| Sweden | 24% | 30% | 33% | 14% |
| Greece | 23% | 28% | 40% | 9% |
| Switzerland | 19% | 24% | 43% | 14% |
| Austria | 11% | 27% | 51% | 10% |
| Italy | 10% | 21% | 68% | 1% |

=== Plastic Surgeon Measuring System ===
Measuring cup size
| Measurement | | Cup size |
| inch | cm | Cup size |
|---|---|---|
| 7.0 | 17.8 | A |
| 7.5 | 19.1 | A |
| 8.0 | 20.3 | B |
| 8.5 | 21.6 | B |
| 9.0 | 22.9 | C |
| 9.5 | 24.1 | C |
| 10.0 | 25.4 | D |
| 10.5 | 26.7 | D |
| 11.0 | 27.9 | DD |

Those who have difficulty calculating a correct cup size may be able to find a correct fit using a method adopted by plastic surgeons. Using a flexible tape measure, position the tape at the outside of the chest, under the arm, where the breast tissue begins. Measure across the fullest part of the breast, usually across the nipple, to where the breast tissue stops at the breast bone.

Conversion of the measurement to cup size is shown in the "Measuring cup size" table.

In general, countries that employ metric cup sizing (like in § Continental Europe) have their own system of 2 cm (0.79 in) increments that result in cup sizes which differ from those using inches, since 1 inch (2.54 cm) does not equal 2 centimetres (0.79 in).

These cup measurements are only correct for converting cup sizes for a 34-inch (86 cm) band to cm using this particular method, because cup size is relative to band size. This principle means that bras of differing band size can have the same volume. For example, the cup volume is the same for 30D, 32C, 34B, and 36A. These related bra sizes of the same cup volume are called sister sizes. For a list of such sizes, refer to § Calculating cup volume and breast weight.

=== Consumer fit research ===
A 2012 study by White and Scurr University of Portsmouth compared a method that adds 4 to the band size over-the-bust method used in many United Kingdom lingerie shops with and compared that to measurements obtained using a professional method. The study relied on the professional bra-fitting method described by McGhee and Steele (2010). The study utilized a five-step approach to obtain the best fitting bra size. The study measured 45 women using the traditional selection method that adds 4 to the band size over-the-bust method. Women tried bras on until they obtained the best fit based on professional bra fitting criteria. The researchers found that 76% of women overestimated their band and 84% underestimated their cup size. When women wear bras with too big a band, breast support is reduced. Too small a cup size may cause skin irritation. They noted that "ill-fitting bras and insufficient breast support can lead to the development of musculoskeletal pain and inhibit women participating in physical activity.". The study recommended that women should be educated about the criteria for finding a well-fitting bra. They recommended that women measure under their bust to determine their band size rather than the traditional over the bust measurement method.

== Manufacturer design standards ==
Bra-labeling systems used around the world are at times misleading and confusing. Cup and band sizes vary around the world. In countries that have adopted the European EN 13402 dress-size standard, the torso is measured in centimetres and rounded to the nearest multiple of 5 cm. Bra-fitting experts in the United Kingdom state that many women who buy off the rack without professional assistance wear up to two sizes too small.

Manufacturer Fruit of the Loom attempted to solve the problem of finding a well-fitting bra for asymmetrical breasts by introducing Pick Your Perfect Bra, which allow women to choose a bra with two different cup sizes, although it is only available in A through D cup sizes.

Approximate (band) size equivalents between various systems
| Under bust (cm) | 58–62 | 63–67 | 68–72 | 73–77 | 78–82 | 83–87 | 88–92 | 93–97 | 98–102 | 103–107 | 108–112 | 113–117 | 118–122 | 123–127 | 128–132 | 133–137 | 138–142 |
|---|---|---|---|---|---|---|---|---|---|---|---|---|---|---|---|---|---|
| Under bust (in) | 24–25 | 26–27 | 28–29 | 30–31 | 32–33 | 34–35 | 36–37 | 38–39 | 40–41 | 42–43 | 44–45 | 46–47 | 48–49 | 50–51 | 52–53 | 54–55 | 56–57 |
| EU, Iran | 60 | 65 | 70 | 75 | 80 | 85 | 90 | 95 | 100 | 105 | 110 | 115 | 120 | 125 | 130 | 135 | 140 |
| FR, BE, ES | 75 | 80 | 85 | 90 | 95 | 100 | 105 | 110 | 115 | 120 | 125 | 130 | 135 | 140 | 145 | 150 | 155 |
| IT | 0 | 1 | 2 | 3 | 4 | 5 | 6 | 7 | 8 | 9 | 10 | 11 | 12 | 13 | 14 | 15 | 16 |
| US, UK, PT | 28 | 30 | 32 | 34 | 36 | 38 | 40 | 42 | 44 | 46 | 48 | 50 | 52 | 54 | 56 | 58 | 60 |
| UK, RoI, PT | 24 | 26 | 28 | 30 | 32 | 34 | 36 | 38 | 40 | 42 | 44 | 46 | 48 | 50 | 52 | 54 | 56 |
| AU, NZ | 6 | 8 | 10 | 12 | 14 | 16 | 18 | 20 | 22 | 24 | 26 | 28 | 30 | 32 | 34 | 36 | 38 |
| UK dress | 4 | 6 | 8 | 10 | 12 | 14 | 16 | 18 | 20 | 22 | 24 | 26 | 28 | 30 | 32 | 34 | 36 |

There are two prominent discrepancies between sizing systems:

- The use of inches (US, UK) versus centimetres (EU, FR), or another ordinal numeral system (IT, AU)
- Whether the label band size corresponds directly to the underbust (EU, UK) or refers to a larger number (US "underbust+4", FR "underbust+15")

There are several sizing systems in different countries.

Cup size is determined by one of two methods: in the US and UK, it increases by one cup size for every inch, while in all other systems, it increases by one cup size for every two centimetres. Since one inch equals 2.54 centimetres, there is a 21.6% discrepancy between the systems, which becomes more pronounced as cup sizes increase. Also important are the different starting points for the lettering system ("A" can refer to different ranges of upper-underbust differences) and irregularities in higher letters (e.g. DD vs. E).

Many bras are only available in 36 sizes.

=== UK ===
These are equivalent UK cup volumes

The UK and US use the inch system. The difference in chest circumference between the cup sizes is always one inch, or 2.54 cm. The difference between 2 band sizes is 2 inches or 5.08 cm.

Leading brands and manufacturers including Panache, Bestform, Gossard, Freya, Curvy Kate, Bravissimo and Fantasie, which use the British standard band sizes (where underbust measurement equals band size) 28-30-32-34-36-38-40-42-44, and so on. Cup sizes are designated by AA-A-B-C-D-DD-E-F-FF-G-GG-H-HH-J-JJ-K-KK-L.

However, some clothing retailers and mail order companies have their own house brands and use a custom sizing system. Marks and Spencers uses AA-A-B-C-D-DD-E-F-G-GG-H-J, leaving out FF and HH, in addition to following the US band sizing convention. As a result, their J-Cup is equal to a British standard H-cup. Evans and ASDA sell bras (ASDA as part of their George clothing range) whose sizing runs A-B-C-D-DD-E-F-G-H. Their H-Cup is roughly equal to a British standard G-cup.

Some retailers reserve AA for young teens, and use AAA for women.

=== Australia/New Zealand ===
Australia and New Zealand cup and band sizes are in metric increases of 2 cm per cup similar to many European brands. Cup labelling methods and sizing schemes are inconsistent and there is great variability between brands. In general, cup sizes AA-DD follow UK labels but thereafter split off from this system and employ European labels (no double letters with cups progressing from F-G-H etc. for every 2 cm increase). However, a great many local manufacturers employ unique labelling systems Australia and New Zealand bra band sizes are labelled in dress size, although they are obtained by under bust measurement whilst dress sizes utilise bust-waist-hip. In practice very few of the leading Australian manufacturers produce sizes F+ and many disseminate sizing misinformation. The Australian demand for DD+ is largely met by various UK, US and European major brands. This has introduced further sizing scheme confusion that is poorly understood even by specialist retailers.

=== United States ===
Bra sizing in the United States is very similar to the United Kingdom. Band sizes use the same designation in inches and the cups also increase by 1-inch-steps. However, some manufacturers use conflicting sizing methods. Some label bras beyond a C cup as D-DD-DDD-DDDD-E-EE-EEE-EEEE-F..., some use the variation: D1, D2, D3, D4, D5..... but many use the following system: A, B, C, D, DD, DDD, G, H, I, J, K, L, M, N, O. and others label them like the British system D-DD-E-F-FF... Comparing the larger cup sizes between different manufacturers can be difficult.

In 2013, underwear maker Jockey International offered a new way to measure bra and cup size. It introduced a system with ten cup sizes per band size that are numbered and not lettered, designated as 1–36, 2–36 etc. The company developed the system over eight years, during which they scanned and measured the breasts and torsos of 800 women. Researchers also tracked the women's use of their bras at home. To implement the system, women must purchase a set of plastic cups from the company to find their Jockey cup size. Some analysts were critical of the requirement to buy the measurement kit, since women must pay about US$20 to adopt Jockey's proprietary system, in addition to the cost of the bras themselves.

=== Europe / International ===
Band size
| Underbust circumference | Bust size | Underbust size | | |
| cm | FR/BE/ES | EU | IT | |
|---|---|---|---|---|
| 58–62 | 75 | 60 | 0 | |
| 63–67 | 80 | 65 | 1 | I |
| 68–72 | 85 | 70 | 2 | II |
| 73–77 | 90 | 75 | 3 | III |
| 78–82 | 95 | 80 | 4 | IV, IIII |
| 83–87 | 100 | 85 | 5 | V |
| 88–92 | 105 | 90 | 6 | VI |
| 93–97 | 110 | 95 | 7 | VII |
| 98–102 | 115 | 100 | 8 | VIII |
| 103–107 | 120 | 105 | 9 | IX, VIIII |
| 108–112 | 125 | 110 | 10 | X |

European bra sizes are based on centimetres. They are also known as International. Abbreviations such as EU, Intl and Int are all referring to the same European bra size convention. These sizes are used in most of Europe and large parts of the world.

Cup size
| Difference [cm] | Cup |
|---|---|
| 10–12 | AA |
| 12–14 | A |
| 14–16 | B |
| 16–18 | C |
| 18–20 | D |
| 20–22 | E |
| 22–24 | F |
| 24–26 | G |
| 26–28 | H |

The underbust measurement is rounded to the nearest multiple of 5 cm. Band sizes run 65, 70, 75, 80 etc., increasing in steps of 5 cm, similar to the English double inch. A person with a measured underbust circumference of 78–82 cm should wear a band size 80. The tightness or snugness of the measurement (e.g. a tape measure or similar) depends on the adipose tissue softness. Softer tissue require tightening when measuring, this to ensure that the bra band will fit snugly on the body and stay in place. A loose measurement can, and often does, vary from the tighter measurement. This causes some confusion as a person with a loose measurement of 84 cm would think they have band size 85 but due to a lot of soft tissue the same person might have a snugger and tighter and of 79 cm and should choose the more appropriate band size of 80 or even smaller band size.

The cup labels begin normally with "A" for an 13±1 cm difference between bust and underbust circumference measurement measured loosely (i.e. not tightly as for bra band size), i.e. the not between bust circumference and band size (that normally require some tightening when measured).To clarify the important difference in measuring: Underbust measuring for bra band is done snugly and tight while measuring underbust for determining bra cups is done loosely. For people with much soft adipose tissue these two measurements will not be identical. In this sense the method to determine European sizes differ compared to English systems where the cup sizes are determined by bust measurement compared to bra band size. European cups increase for every additional 2 cm in difference between bust and underbust measurement, instead of 2.5 cm or 1-inch, and except for the initial cup size letters are neither doubled nor skipped. In very large cup sizes this causes smaller cups than their English counterparts.

This system has been standardized in the European dress size standard EN 13402 introduced in 2006, but was in use in many European countries before that date.

=== South Korea/Japan ===
In South Korea and Japan the torso is measured in centimetres and rounded to the nearest multiple of 5 cm. Band sizes run 65-70-75-80..., increasing in steps of 5 cm, similar to the English double inch. A person with a loosely measured underbust circumference of 78–82 cm should wear a band size 80.

The cup labels begin with "AAA" for a 5±1.25 cm difference between bust and underbust circumference, i.e. similar bust circumference and band size as in the English systems. They increase in steps of 2.5 cm, and except for the initial cup size letters are neither doubled nor skipped.

Japanese sizes are the same as Korean ones, but the cup labels begin with "AA" for a 7.5±1.25 cm difference and usually precedes the bust designation, i.e. "B75" instead of "75B".

This system has been standardized in the Korea dress size standard KS K9404 introduced in 1999 and in Japan dress size standard JIS L4006 introduced in 1998.

=== France/Belgium/Spain ===
The French and Spanish system is a permutation of the Continental European sizing system. While cup sizes are the same, band sizes are exactly 15 cm larger than the European band size.

=== Italy ===
The Italian band size uses small consecutive integers instead of the underbust circumference rounded to the nearest multiple of 5 cm. Since it starts with size 0 for European size 60, the conversion consists of a division by 5 and then a subtraction of 12. The size designations are often given in Roman numerals.

Cup sizes have traditionally used a step size of 2.5 cm, which is close to the English inch of 2.54 cm, and featured some double letters for large cups, but in recent years some Italian manufacturers have switched over to the European 2-cm system.

Here is a conversion table for bra sizes in Italy with respect other countries:

| Italy | I | II | III | IV | V | VI | VII | VIII |
| Europe | 65 | 70 | 75 | 80 | 85 | 90 | 95 | 100 |
| UK & USA | 30 | 32 | 34 | 36 | 38 | 40 | 42 | 44 |
| France & Spain | 80 | 85 | 90 | 95 | 100 | 105 | 110 | 115 |

=== Advertising and retail influence ===
Manufacturers' marketing and advertising often appeals to fashion and image over fit, comfort, and function. Since about 1994, manufacturers have re-focused their advertising, moving from advertising functional brassieres that emphasize support and foundation, to selling lingerie that emphasize fashion while sacrificing basic fit and function, like linings under scratchy lace.

=== Engineered Alternative to traditional bras ===
English mechanical engineer and professor John Tyrer from Loughborough University has devised a solution to problematic bra fit by re-engineering bra design. He started investigating the problem of bra design while on an assignment from the British government after his wife returned disheartened from an unsuccessful shopping trip. His initial research into the extent of fitting problems soon revealed that 80% of women wear the wrong size of bra.. He theorised that this widespread practice of purchasing the wrong size was due to the measurement system recommended by bra manufacturers. This sizing system employs a combination of maximum chest diameter (under bust) and maximum bust diameter (bust) rather than the actual breast volume which is to be accommodated by the bra. According to Tyrer, "to get the most supportive and fitted bra it's infinitely better if you know the volume of the breast and the size of the back.". He says the A, B, C, D cup measurement system is flawed. "It's like measuring a motor car by the diameter of the gas cap." "The whole design is fundamentally flawed. It's an instrument of torture." Tyrer has developed a bra design with crossed straps in the back. These use the weight of one breast to lift the other using counterbalance. Standard designs constrict chest movement during breathing. One of the tools used in the development of Tyrer's design has been a projective differential shape body analyzer for 40,000 GBP.

Breasts weigh up to ~1 kg and not ~0.2 .. 0.3 kg. Tyrer said, "By measuring the diameter of the chest and breasts current measurements are supposed to tell you something about the size and volume of each breast, but in fact it doesn't". Bra companies remain reluctant to manufacture Tyrer's prototype, which is a front closing bra with more vertical orientation and adjustable cups.

=== Calculating cup volume and breast mass ===
The average breast weighs about 0.5 kilograms (1.1 lb). Each breast contributes to about 4–5% of the body fat. The density of fatty tissue is more or less equal to 0.9 g/cm^{3} (0.52 oz/cu in).

If a cup is a hemisphere, its volume V is given by the following formula:

$$V=\frac{2 \pi r^3}{3}=\frac{\pi D^3}{12}$$

where r is the radius of the cup and D is its diameter.

If the cup is a hemi-ellipsoid, its volume is given by the formula:

$$V =\frac{2 \pi a b c}{3} \approx \frac{\pi \times cw \times cd \times wl}{12}$$

where a, b, and c are the three semi-axes of the hemi-ellipsoid; and cw, cd, and wl are respectively the cup width, the cup depth, and the length of the wire.

Cups give a hemi-spherical shape to breasts and underwires give shape to cups. So the curvature radius of the underwire is the key parameter to determine volume and weight of the breast. The same underwires are used for the cups of sizes 36A, 34B, 32C, 30D etc. ... so those cups have the same volume. The reference numbers of underwire sizes are based on a B cup bra, for example underwire size 32 is for 32B cup (and 34A, 30C...). An underwire size 30 width has a curvature diameter of 3 5/6 inches (9.7 cm) and this diameter increases by 1/3 inch (0.85 cm) by size. The table below shows volume calculations for some cups that can be found in a ready-to-wear large size shop.

| Underwire size | Bra size (US system) | Bra size (UK system) | Cup diameter | Volume of one cup | Mass of both breasts |
|---|---|---|---|---|---|
| 30 | 32A 30B 28C | 32A 30B 28C | 9.7 cm (3 5/6 in) | 240 cm^{3} (15 cu in) | 0.43 kg (0.95 lb) |
| 32 | 34A 32B 30C 28D | 34A 32B 30C 28D | 10.6 cm (4 1/6 in) | 310 cm^{3} (19 cu in) | 0.56 kg (1.2 lb) |
| 34 | 36A 34B 32C 30D 28E | 36A 34B 32C 30D 28DD | 11.4 cm (4 1/2 in) | 390 cm^{3} (24 cu in) | 0.70 kg (1.5 lb) |
| 36 | 38A 36B 34C 32D 30E 28F | 38A 36B 34C 32D 30DD 28E | 12.3 cm (4 5/6 in) | 480 cm^{3} (29 cu in) | 0.86 kg (1.9 lb) |
| 38 | 40A 38B 36C 34D 32E 30F 28G | 40A 38B 36C 34D 32DD 30E 28F | 13.1 cm (5 1/6 in) | 590 cm^{3} (36 cu in) | 1.1 kg (2.4 lb) |
| 40 | 42A 40B 38C 36D 34E 32F 30G 28H | 42A 40B 38C 36D 34DD 32E 30F 28FF | 14.0 cm (5 1/2 in) | 710 cm^{3} (43 cu in) | 1.3 kg (2.9 lb) |
| 42 | 44A 42B 40C 38D 36E 34F 32G 30H 28I | 44A 42B 40C 38D 36DD 34E 32F 30FF 28G | 14.8 cm (5 5/6 in) | 850 cm^{3} (52 cu in) | 1.5 kg (3.3 lb) |
| 44 | 44B 42C 40D 38E 36F 34G 32H 30I 28J | 44B 42C 40D 38DD 36E 34F 32FF 30G 28GG | 15.7 cm (6 1/6 in) | 1,000 cm^{3} (61 cu in) | 1.8 kg (4.0 lb) |
| 46 | 44C 42D 40E 38F 36G 34H 32I 30J 28K | 44C 42D 40DD 38E 36F 34FF 32G 30GG 28H | 16.5 cm (6 1/2 in) | 1,180 cm^{3} (72 cu in) | 2.1 kg (4.6 lb) |
| 48 | 44D 42E 40F 38G 36H 34I 32J 30K 28L | 44D 42DD 40E 38F 36FF 34G 32GG 30H 28HH | 17.4 cm (6 5/6 in) | 1,370 cm^{3} (84 cu in) | 2.5 kg (5.5 lb) |
| 50 | 44E 42F 40G 38H 36I 34J 32K 30L 28M | 44DD 42E 40F 38FF 36G 34GG 32H 30HH 28J | 18.2 cm (7 1/6 in) | 1,580 cm^{3} (96 cu in) | 2.8 kg (6.2 lb) |
| 52 | 44F 42G 40H 38I 36J 34K 32L 30M 28N | 44E 42F 40FF 38G 36GG 34H 32HH 30J 28JJ | 19.0 cm (7 1/2 in) | 1,810 cm^{3} (110 cu in) | 3.3 kg (7.3 lb) |
| 54 | 44G 42H 40I 38J 36K 34L 32M 30N 28O | 44F 42FF 40G 38GG 36H 34HH 32J 30JJ 28K | 19.9 cm (7 5/6 in) | 2,060 cm^{3} (126 cu in) | 3.7 kg (8.2 lb) |
| 56 | 44H 42I 40J 38K 36L 34M 32N 30O 28P | 44FF 42G 40GG 38H 36HH 34J 32JJ 30K 28KK | 20.7 cm (8 1/6 in) | 2,340 cm^{3} (143 cu in) | 4.2 kg (9.3 lb) |
| 58 | 44I 42J 40K 38L 36M 34N 32O 30P | 44G 42GG 40H 38HH 36J 34JJ 32K 30KK | 21.6 cm (8 1/2 in) | 2,640 cm^{3} (161 cu in) | 4.8 kg (11 lb) |
| 60 | 44J 42K 40L 38M 36N 34O 32P | 44GG 42H 40HH 38J 36JJ 34K 32KK | 22.4 cm (8 5/6 in) | 3,000 cm^{3} (180 cu in) | 5.3 kg (12 lb) |

== See also ==
- History of bras
- List of bra designs
- Nursing bra
- Underwire bra
- Wonderbra
