= List of bra designs =

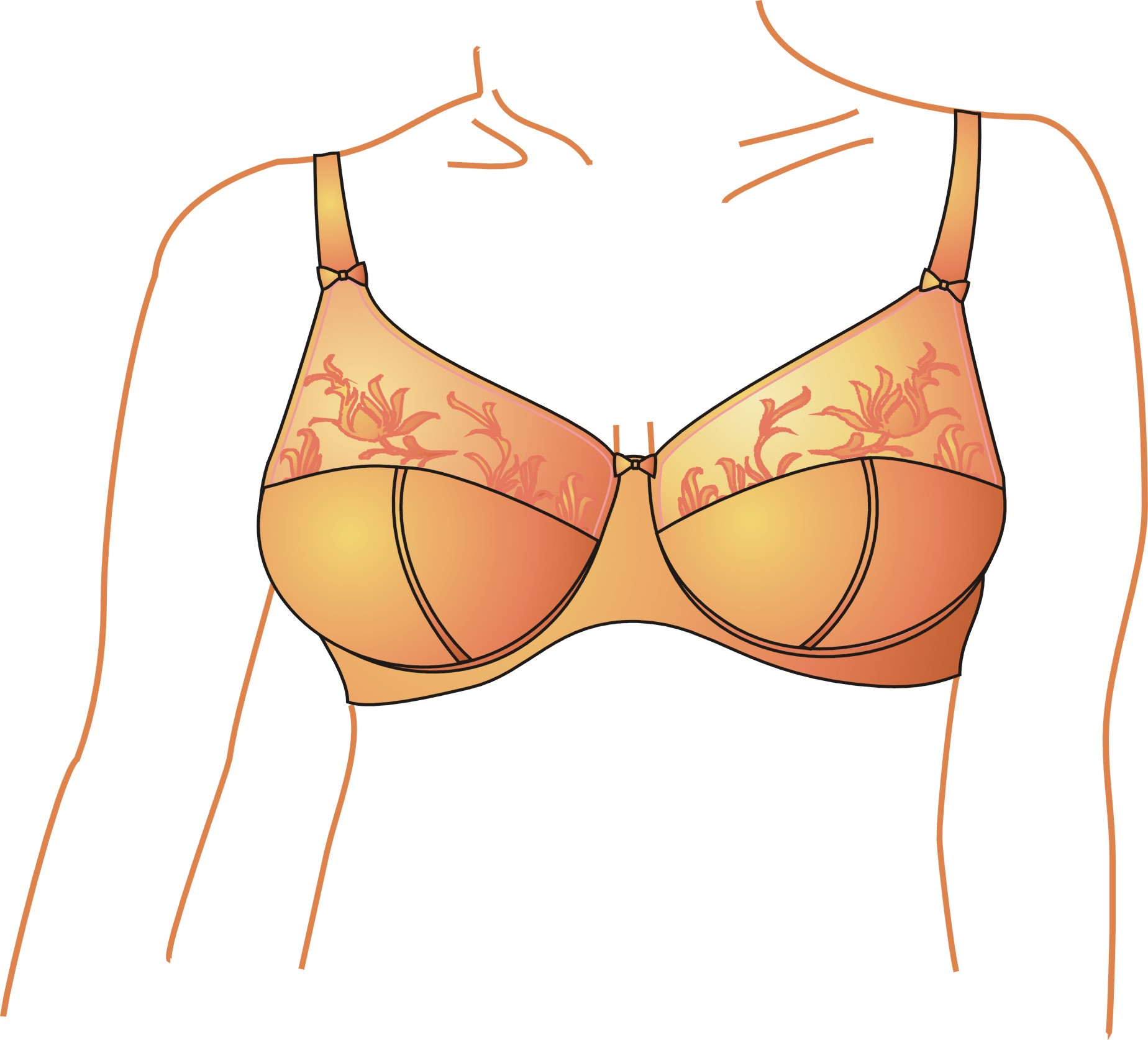
Full-cup bra

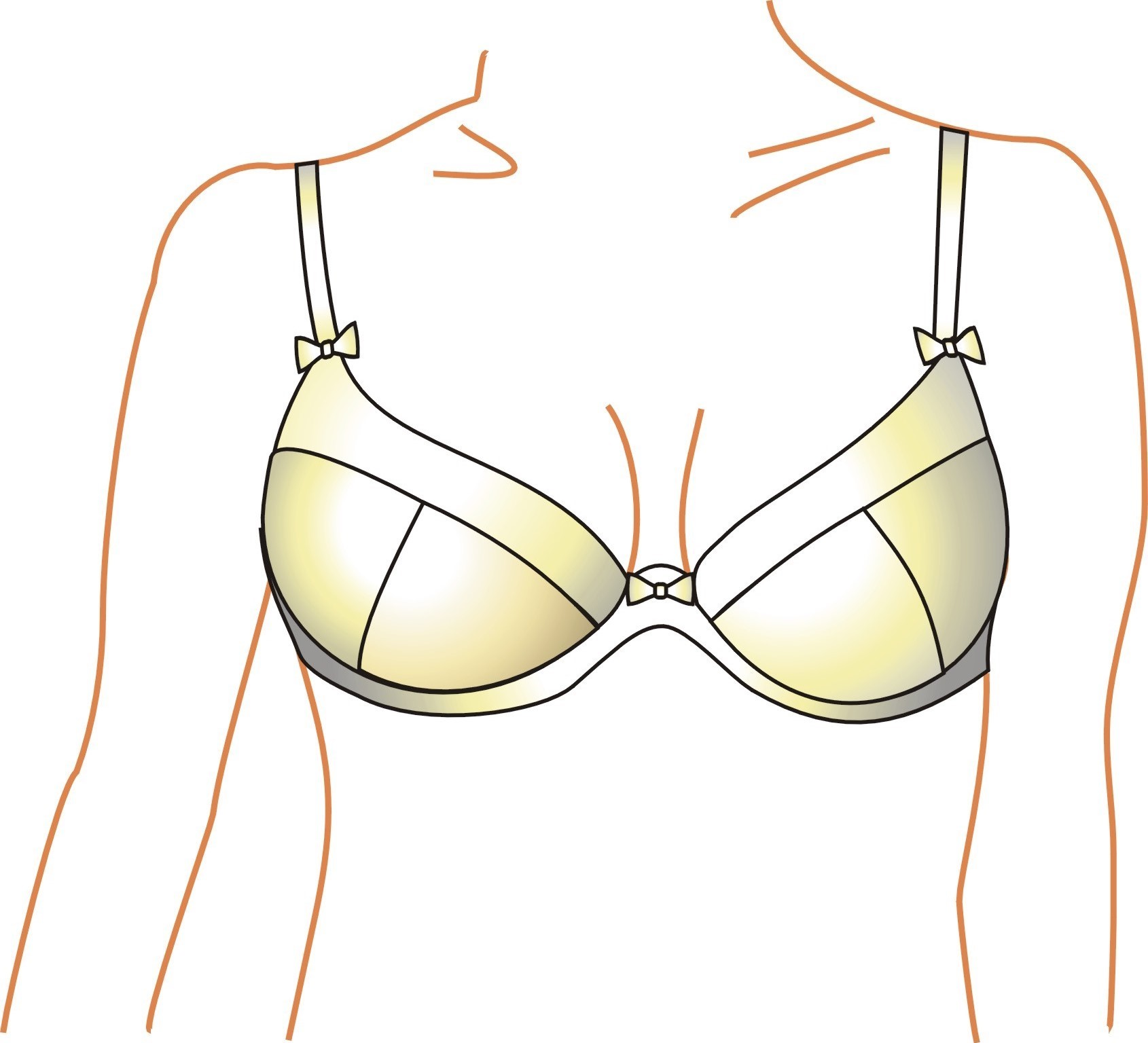
Plunge

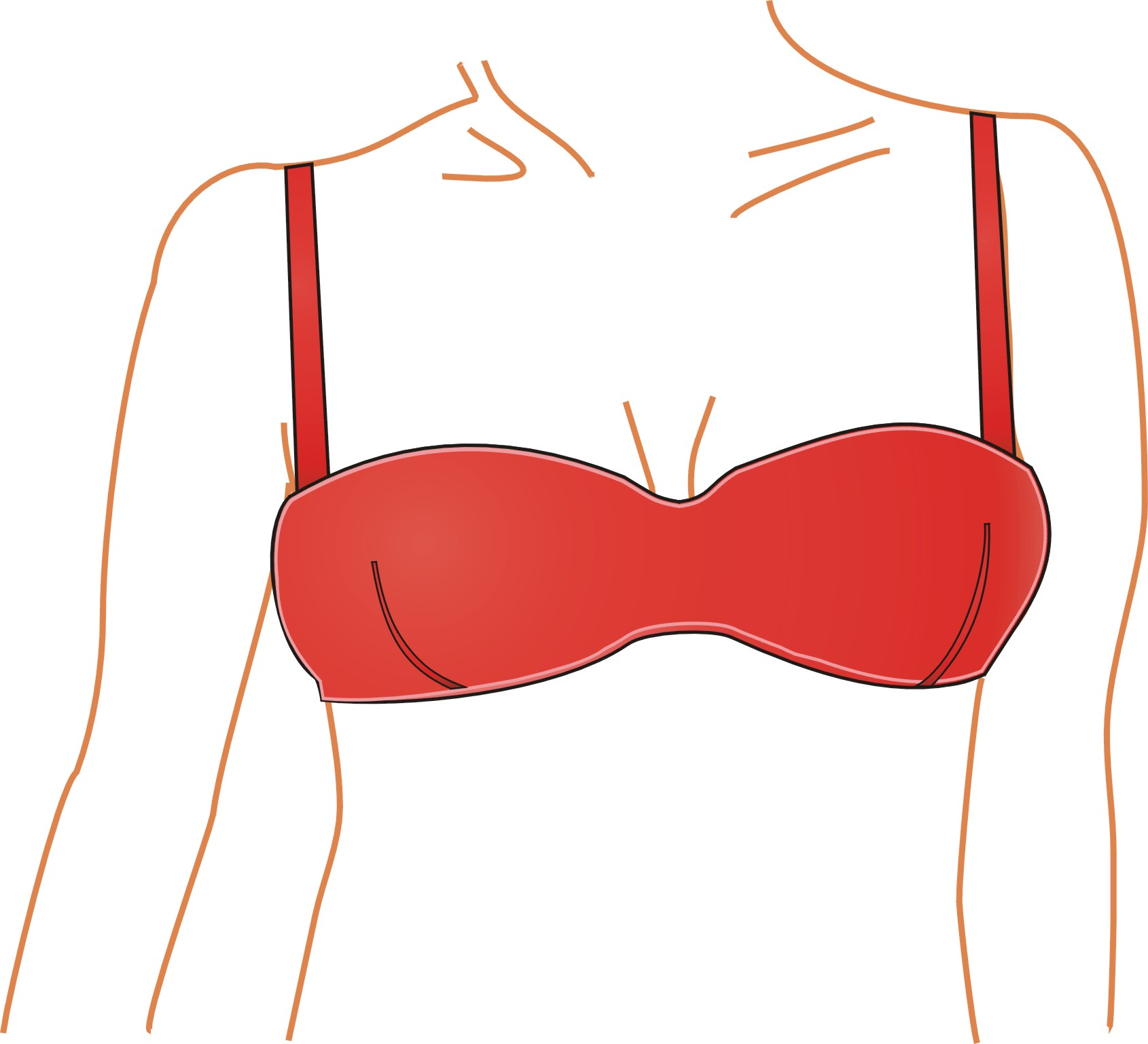
Balconette

There are many brassiere designs suitable for a wide variety of business and social settings and to wear with a variety of outer clothing. The bra's shape, coverage, functionality, fit, fashion, fabric, and color can vary widely. Some bras are designed to offer basic, practical support and coverage while others are purposefully sexual, sensual, or revealing.

Manufacturers' bra designs and styles constantly change. There is no standardized system for categorizing bras, and they are made in a wide variety of designs, including those listed here and others like bridal bra, plus size bra, vintage bra, leather bra, and belly dance bra. Many bras fulfil more than one purpose, like a balconette bra made of sheer material.

== List of bra design terms ==
=== Shape ===
- Backless: Suitable for bare-shoulder outer garments like a backless evening gown that exposes the back.
- Balconette: The cup cut is horizontal which creates a lift upward, like a balcony, but not inward. Sometimes known as a shelf bra. One source equates them to a balcony bra. Lifts the breasts to enhance their appearance, shape, and cleavage. The name means "little balcony" which refers to the horizontal cut; it is also claimed, less plausibly, that the name comes from the notion that the bra is not visible from above, as when looking down from a balcony. First designed in the United States in about 1938, and came into mainstream fashion in the 1950s.
- Balcony: Similar to a balconette or demi-cup bra, but the sides are higher and the front is lower exposing more cleavage.
- Bandeau: A simple band of material, usually stretchy, that is worn across the breasts. Suitable for small busts, they sometimes have built-in cups, but provide little support or shaping. A band of cloth can sometimes be used to bind the breasts in place.
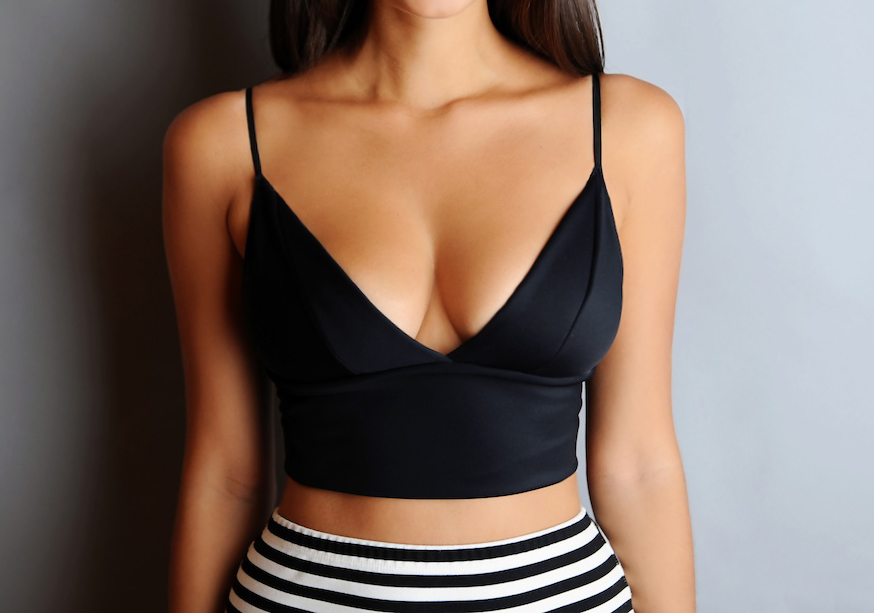
- Bralette (bralet) top
  Bralette: A lightweight, simple design, usually an unlined, soft-cup pullover style bra. The breasts are covered but the bra offers little, if any, real support and is suitable for small busts. Sometimes sold built into a camisole. This style is often used by preadolescent girls as a training bra to conceal the developing nipples and breasts.
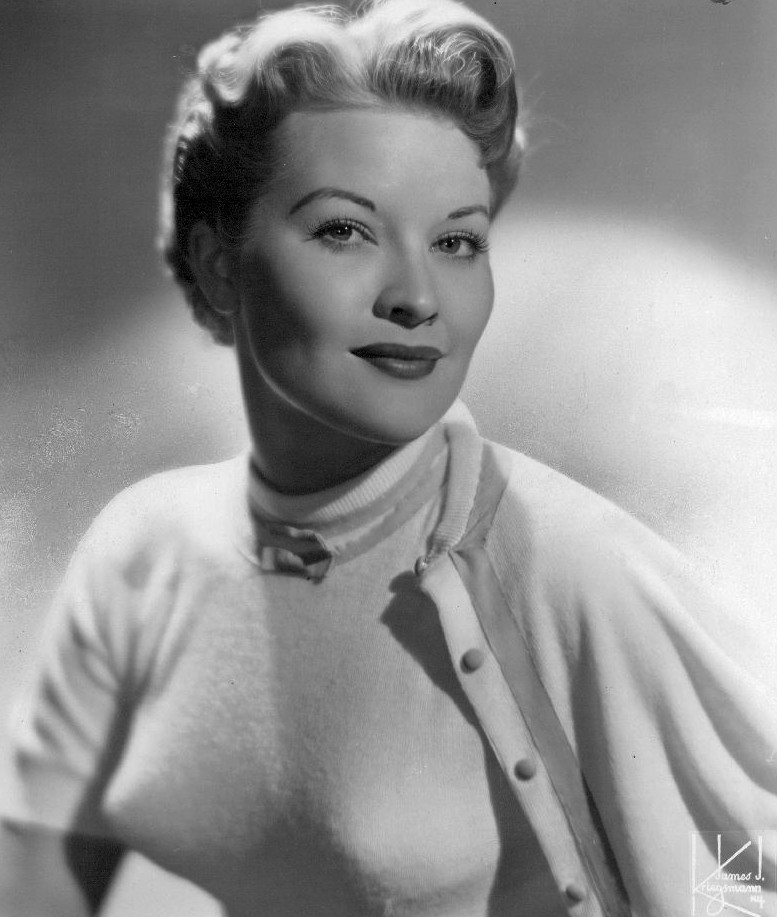
- Patti Page wearing a bullet bra (1955)
  Bullet: A full-support bra with cups in the shape of a paraboloid with its axis perpendicular to the breast. The bullet bra usually features concentric circles or spirals of decorative stitching centered on the nipples, exaggerating the breasts. Invented in the 1940s, they were fashionable in the 1940s, 1950s, and early 1960s, before softer, more natural-looking bras became fashionable again. They were associated with "sweater girl" pin-ups. In 1990, Madonna revivified interest in the bullet bra when she wore one in a costume designed by Jean Paul Gaultier. Vintage lingerie company What Katie Did was the first company to put the bullet bra back into production in 1999.
- Contour: Sometimes referred to as a molded or molded-cup bra, except the contour bra will generally have an underwire not always seen in the molded bra. Contour bras have seamless, pre-formed cups containing a foam or other lining that helps define and hold the cup's shape, even when not being worn. May be available as full-cup, demi-cup, push-up, or in other styles. Can be useful when a women's breasts are asymmetrical (which is common – up to 25% of women's breasts are asymmetric – or with enlarged or differently shaped nipples who want to create a symmetrical silhouette.)
- Convertible: Also known as a multiway bra. The bra straps can be detached and rearranged in different ways depending on the outer garment. Alternative strap arrangements include traditional over-the-shoulder, criss-cross, halter, strapless and one-shoulder.
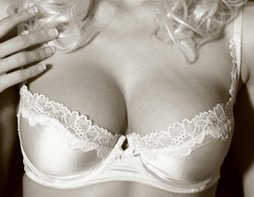
- Demi-cup bra
  Demi-cup: Sometimes referred to as a half-, Half-cup or shelf bra. A partial-cup bra style that covers from half to three-quarters of the breast and creates cleavage and uplift. Most demi-cup bras are designed with a slight tilt that pushes the breasts toward the center to display more cleavage. The straps usually attach at the outer edge of the cup. The lingerie industry generally defines a demi-cup bra as covering about 1 inch (25 mm) above the nipple. The underwire used is shorter and forms a shallower "U" shape under the cup. Suitable for low-cut outer garments.
- Halter: The straps lead up the front of the chest and connect up around the back of the neck making them perfect for backless or halter-type dresses. Some halter bras are also convertible bras.
- Long-line: Extends from the bosom to the waist, offering additional abdominal control and smoothing of the woman's torso. Distributes support over the entire lower torso instead of at bust level as with narrow-band bras.
- Minimizer: Designed to de-emphasize the bosom, it compresses and flattens the breasts.
- Molded: Often compared to a contour bra. The cups are pre-shaped without seams providing a natural, smooth, rounded look under tight fitting clothing. Some are unpadded and may not include an underwire.
- Nude: When defining a style, see Adhesive bra below. When defining a color, it uses material that matched the skin-tone of the woman.
- Peek-a-boo: Intended for romantic occasions, this bra type has cups that can be opened. The cups are made of two parts held together by tied ribbons.
- Plunge: Sometimes known as U-plunge bra if they are particularly plunging with a distinct u-shaped opening between the breasts. Allows for lower cleavage. Designed with angled cups and an open and lowered center gore. The shoulder straps are usually set widely apart. Suitable for dresses or outfits with a deep décolleté or plunging neckline, like a blouse or dress. Also suitable for swimwear, even for women with fuller breasts. Unlike push-up bras, plunge bras are not generally as heavily padded, as many women with larger breasts wear them.
- Push-up: A fashion bra that creates the appearance of increased cleavage. Uses angled cups containing padding that pushes the breasts inward and upward, toward the center of the chest. A push-up bra is usually a demi-cup bra. The first push-up bra was patented by Marie Tucek in 1893 in response to a fashion for the Empire silhouette. The design was later popularized by the introduction of a push-up Wonderbra in the 1960s.
- Racerback: Designed with shoulder straps that form a "V" or "T" pattern between the shoulder blades. Suitable for outerwear like tank tops that would expose traditional over-the-shoulder straps. Provides extra support and can be used when traditional straps tend to fall off the woman. Many sports bras use a racerback design to improve support and reduce bounce.
- Shelf: Sometimes referred to as a cupless, open-cup, half-, or even quarter-cup bra. An underwire fashion design that offers minimal breast coverage, supporting only a portion of the underside of the breast, pushing the breast upward, and leaving the nipple and areola uncovered. Suitable for erotic purposes or when a woman would otherwise want to go braless. The exposed nipple may be detectable beneath an outer garment. Built-in bras are sometimes referred to as shelf bras, or integrate a shelf bra into the material.
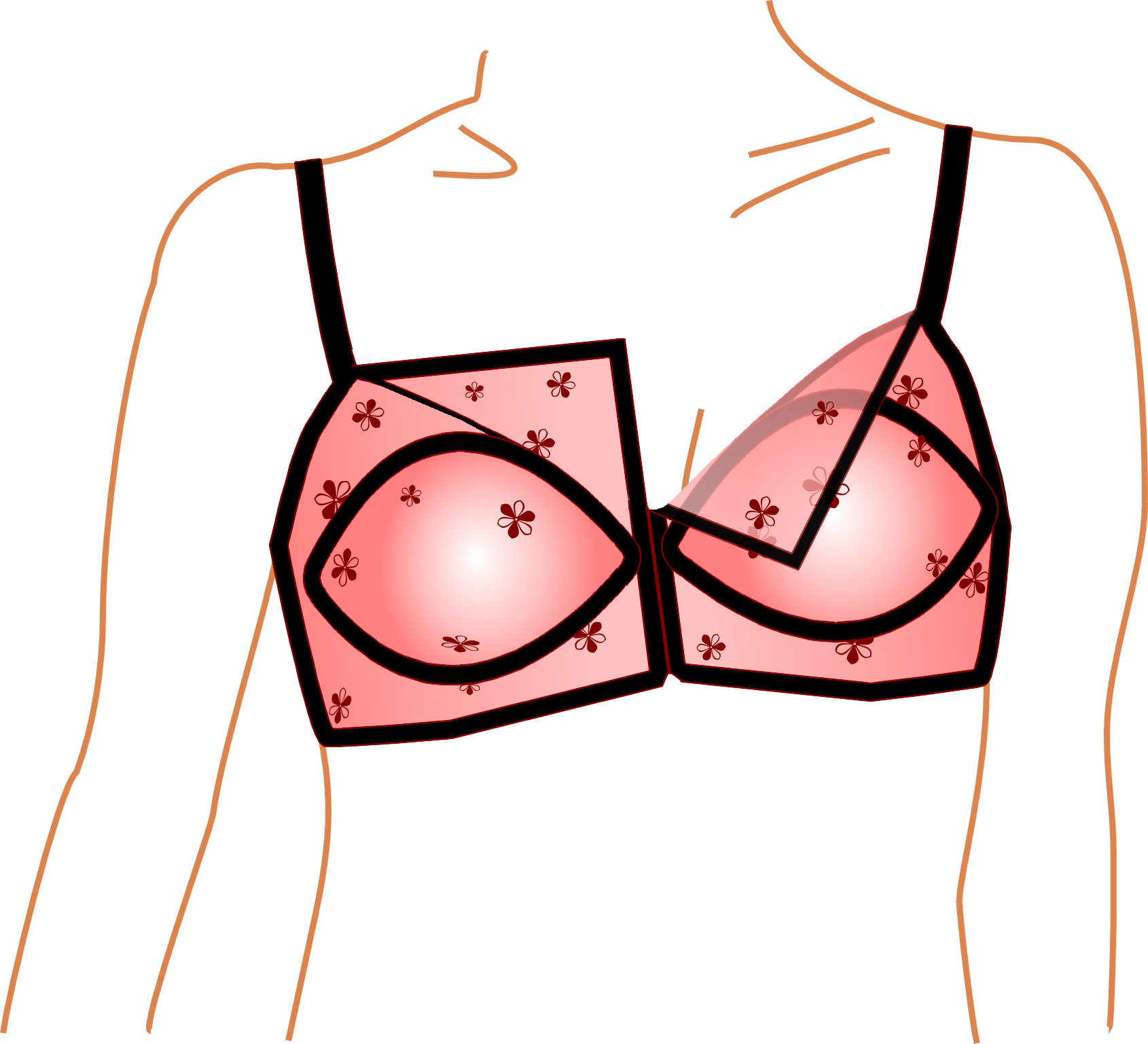
- Shutter bra
  Shutter: dating to c. 1950, with cups that had flaps or lace cuffs at the top. The bra was designed to be partially visible above the neckline of a gown and could be adjusted to vary the amount of cleavage exposed. These bras were often front-fastening.
- Spacer: Similar to a T-shirt bra, but it includes a breathable foam fabric in the cup reducing sweat inside the cups.
- Strapless: A fashion bra that relies on an extra-wide band for breast support. Achieve their strength through a longer underwire that encompasses more of the breast, and cups with added padding, boning, and shaping panels. Suitable for bare-shoulder outer garments like a strapless evening gown that exposes the shoulders and chest, as low as the tops of the areola. Some convertible bras (see above) allow straps to be removed, making a strapless bra. It may have rubberized or silicone beading inside the top edge of the cup to help keep the bra attached to the breast.
- T-shirt: Designed without raised seams, hooks, or other construction that can be seen under an outer garment. A contoured style that fits the breasts smoothly under tightly fitting T-shirts, sweaters, lightweight knitted fabric, or clingy tops with minimal visibility. The cups may be lined with foam or lightly padded with polyfill to help conceal the nipples.
- Training: Designed to help conceal adolescent emerging breasts. As a girl's breasts grow larger, usually around Tanner stage III, this style includes regular bras in smaller styles, from 30AAA to 32B. Most styles are a soft-cup, lightweight, unlined design. Some styles are padded to hide the girl's developing breast buds or to increase the perceived size of the girl's breasts.
- Whirlpool: A predecessor to the later bullet bras, the "Whirlpool stitching" technique—which used concentric rings of stitches in order to encourage a rounded shape—was patented in 1933 by Joseph R Bowen for Hollywood-Maxwell.

=== Construction and size ===
- Adhesive: Sometimes described as backless/strapless or a stick-on bra. Usually made of silicone, polyurethane, or similar material, they are attached to the underside of the breasts using medical-grade adhesive. Some versions provide one piece for each breast. May be reused for a limited number of times and provides little support. Suitable for backless and strapless outerwear where a strapless bra is not possible or preferred, or as an alternative to going completely braless.
- Big cup: Contrary to common belief, big cup and plus size are not synonymous. Plus size bras refer to the band size that is related to the body weight to body height ratio. Big cup refers only to a large breast size on a body that may be slim.
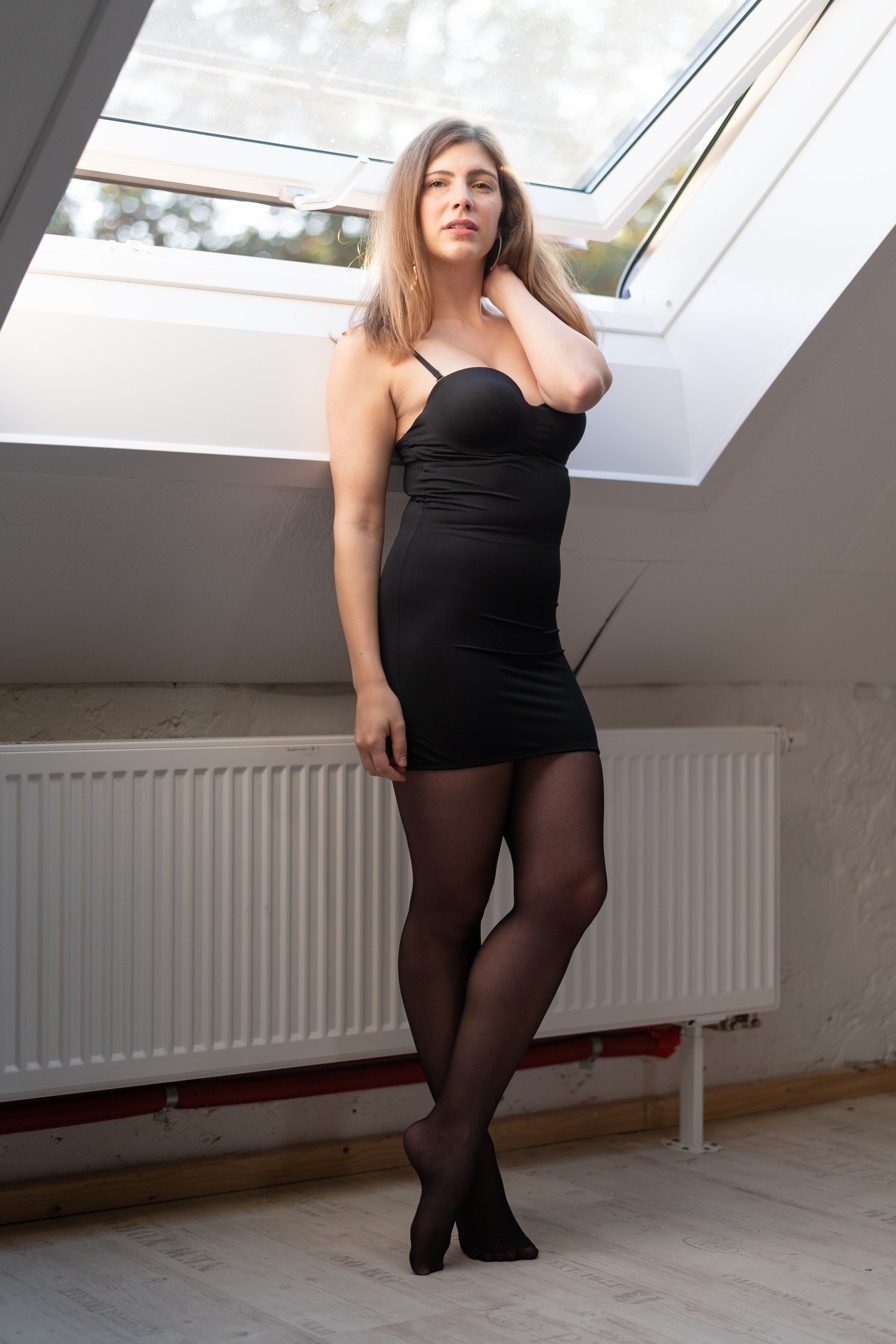
- Full slip with built-in padded bra that may be also worn as a dress
  Built-in: Sometimes referred to as a "shelf bra", although completely unlike the Shelf bra. Contained within or as an integral part of an outer garment like a chemise, swimsuit or tank top. Some built-in bras are detachable. Built-in bras vary in their construction and support ability. Some are bandeau-like which offer limited support. The more advanced built-in bras are effectively real bras with padding and underwire with a full-fledged support ability, these are mainly intended for larger bust that require sturdier support.
- Front-closure: Bras with a single, non-adjustable clasp positioned in the center front gore between the breasts. Full-coverage cups usually have hook-and-eye instead of clasps. This is especially popular for big cup front-closure bras.
- Full-cup: Sometimes called full-support bras. Designed to offer maximum support and coverage for the entire breast. A practical design for large-busted women.
- Full-support: Sometimes known as a full-coverage, full-figure or plus-size bra, although these terms are not actually interchangeable. A practical design that offers maximum coverage and support for larger busts. They generally include a sturdier underwire and more supportive, stretchy materials. They typically feature wider shoulder straps, and hook-and-eye fasteners with more hook rows.
- Padded: Designed to enhance perceived bust size and cleavage. The lining of the cups is thickened and enhanced with shape-enhancing inserts or foam padding inside the entire lining of cup. Padded bras support the breasts but, unlike push-up bras, are not intended to significantly increase cleavage.
- Seamless: The cups are smooth and without any visible seams, making them nearly invisible under tight fitting clothing.
- Sheer: A fashion bra made of translucent material that reveals the nipples.
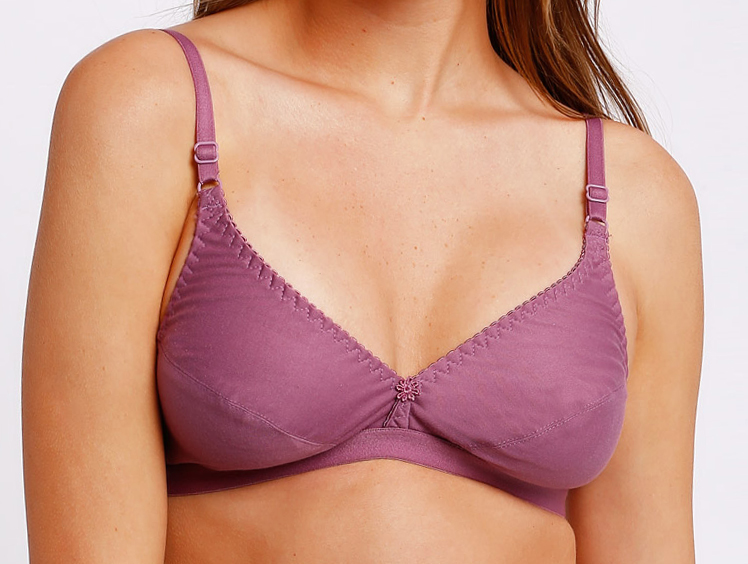
- Soft cup bra
  Soft cup: A practical design that does not use underwire for support. Traditionally regarded as offering less support than underwire models, soft-cup bras now offer competitive support. This is accomplished by using crisscross frames, inner under-cup slings that rise no more than half the height of the cup itself, and padding or lining the bra cup with 2-ply, molded, lined, or seamed material.
- Underwire: Many bra designs feature a thin, semi-circular strip of rigid material that helps support the breast. The wire may be made of either metal, plastic or resin. It is sewn into the bra fabric and under each cup, from the center gore to under the wearer's armpit.
- Water: Sometimes known as a liquid or gel bra. Contains water- or silicone gel-filled cups that enhance the size of the breasts.

=== Use ===
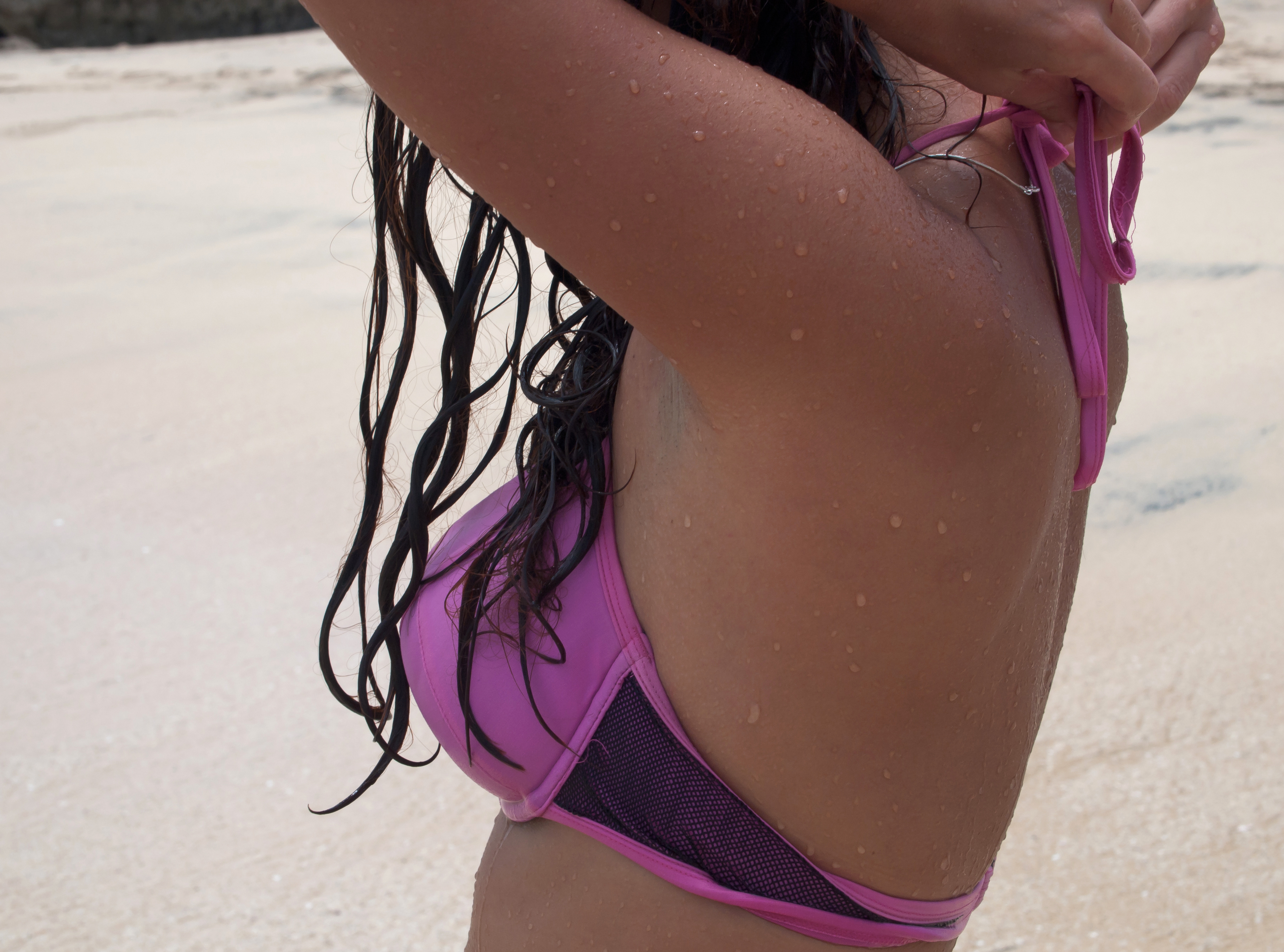
Swimsuit bra

- Belly dance: Most people consider this type of bra as similar to the normal bra. This type of bra is intended to cover up well e.g., a 32C size can fit up with a 34B belly dance bra.
- Bridal: Designed to be worn under a wedding dress and are generally strapless or adhesive with a longline or integrated corset design. May include lace or embroidery.
- Fashion: Defines a category of bras that focus on the look and stylishness of the bra. Highly decorative and colorful bras are typically considered fashion bras and they are available in most of the various styles listed here.
- Hard-cup: Designed for safety. Used in the Saf-t-Bra.
- Male: Worn by men with enlarged breasts. Usually designed to flatten and conceal the breasts rather than to lift and support them.
- Mastectomy: Designed to hold a breast prosthesis that simulates a real breast. Suitable after a mastectomy.
- Maternity: A full-cup design with wider shoulder straps for maximum support and to reduce bounce. Intended to be worn during pregnancy. A practical design that uses comfortable fabrics that minimize irritation. May be adjustable to allow the cup size to expand as pregnancy progresses. Sometimes referred to as a nursing bra which is typically worn after a baby is delivered, but unlike a true nursing bra, does not utilize removable panels or cups that facilitate nursing an infant.
- Medical: Designed to accommodate women who have undergone surgery like mastectomy or breast reduction.
- Novelty: A fashion bra designed for appearance and sensuality. May include unusual materials, like leather or feathers. Includes unusual designs like the open-tip, peekaboo, or peephole bra that feature holes or slits in the fabric that reveal the areolas and nipples. Usually made of sensuous material like Lycra, nylon (nylon tricot), polyester, satin, lace or silk. Suitable for erotic situations.
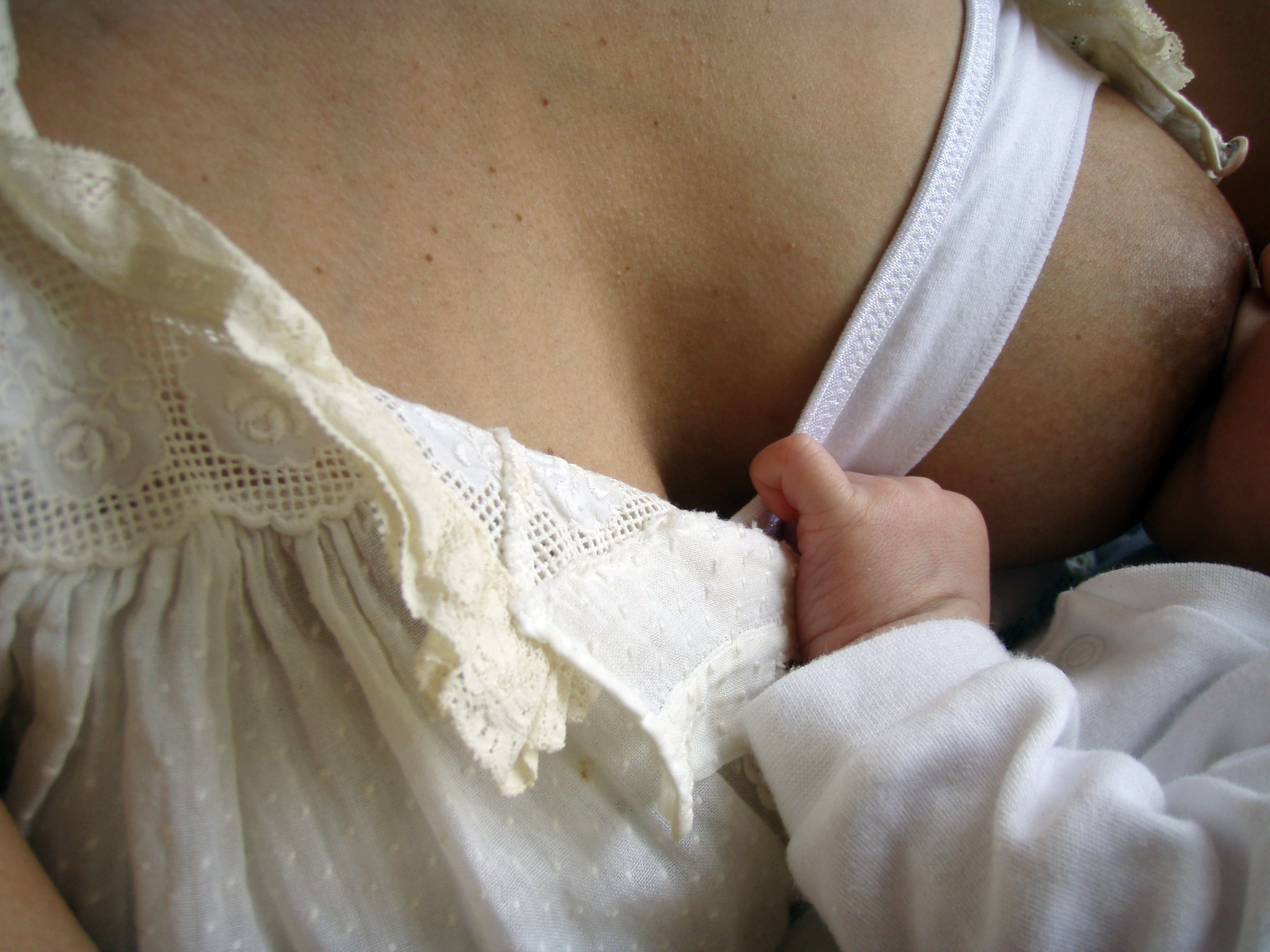
- Nursing bra
  Nursing: Like the maternity bra, this is a practical bra designed with full cups, comfortable fabrics, and wider shoulder straps for increased comfort. Designed to support increased breast size during lactation. Aids breastfeeding by providing flaps or panels that can be unclipped and folded down or to the side, exposing the nipple. Underwires have traditionally been not recommended for nursing bras due to claims they can restrict the flow of milk and cause mastitis, though these claims have no real basis, as underwires by themselves do not cause problems. The wrong bra size, however, can cause problems, with or without underwire. Some designs utilize stretchable fabric allowing the bra to be pulled to one side to facilitate nursing.
- Posture: Reinforce correct spinal posture and alignment.
- Sleep: Sometimes referred to as a leisure or lounge bra. These are very soft, stretchy, comfortable easy-to-wear bras that do not provide much support. They may also be suitable as everyday wear for women with a small bust. They are an alternative to going braless and intended for wear at home when relaxing or asleep. With a large bust, bra support may increase comfort during sleep.
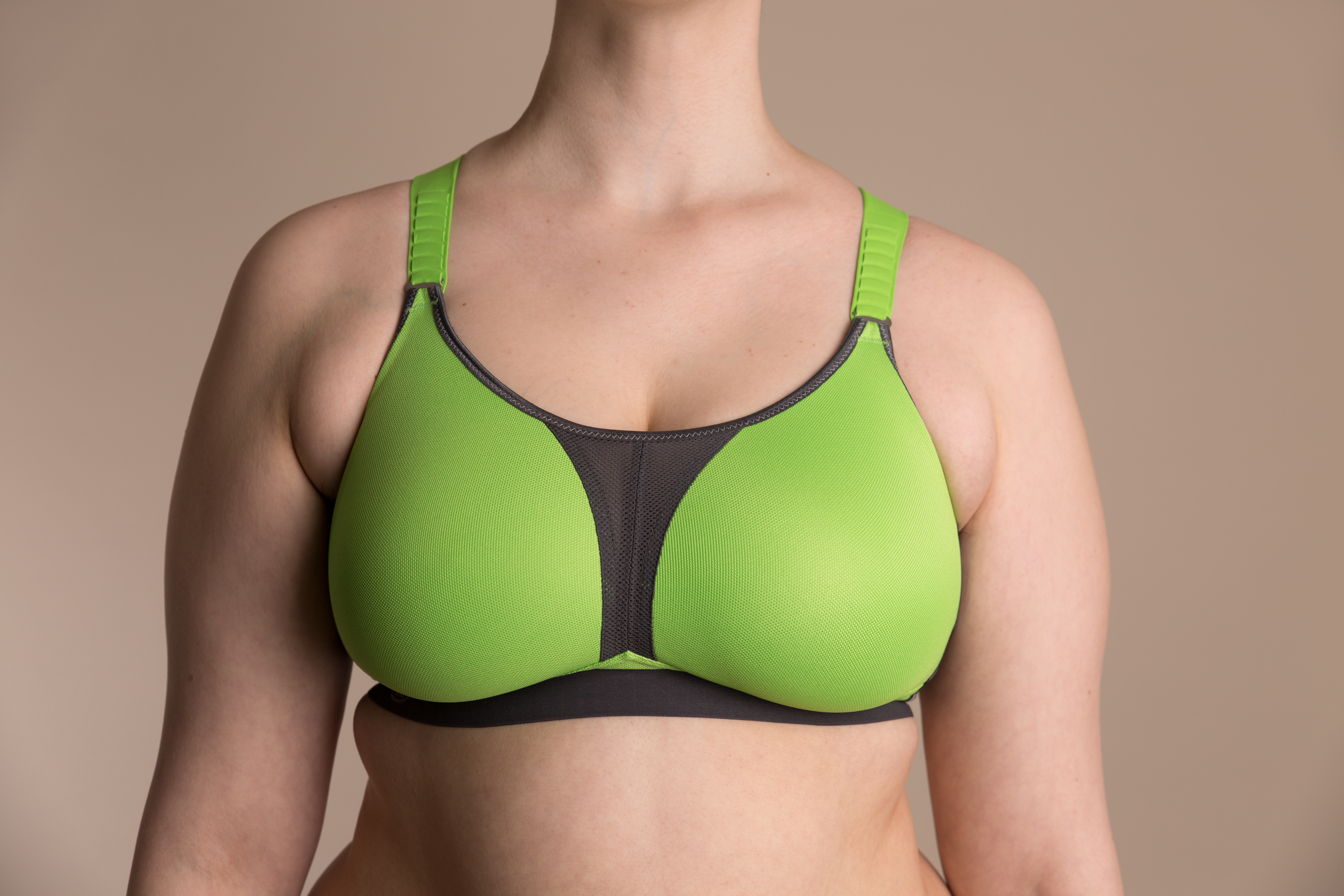
- Sports bra
  Sports: Also known as an athletic or jogging bra. Designed for athletic activities to provide firm support and minimize breast movement during exercise. Various designs are suitable for a range of exercise, ranging from yoga to running. Usually made of stretchable, absorbent fabric like Lycra, and designed to wick perspiration from the skin to reduce irritation.

== See also ==
- Pasties
- Cleavage
