= Nursing bra =

Specialized brassiere

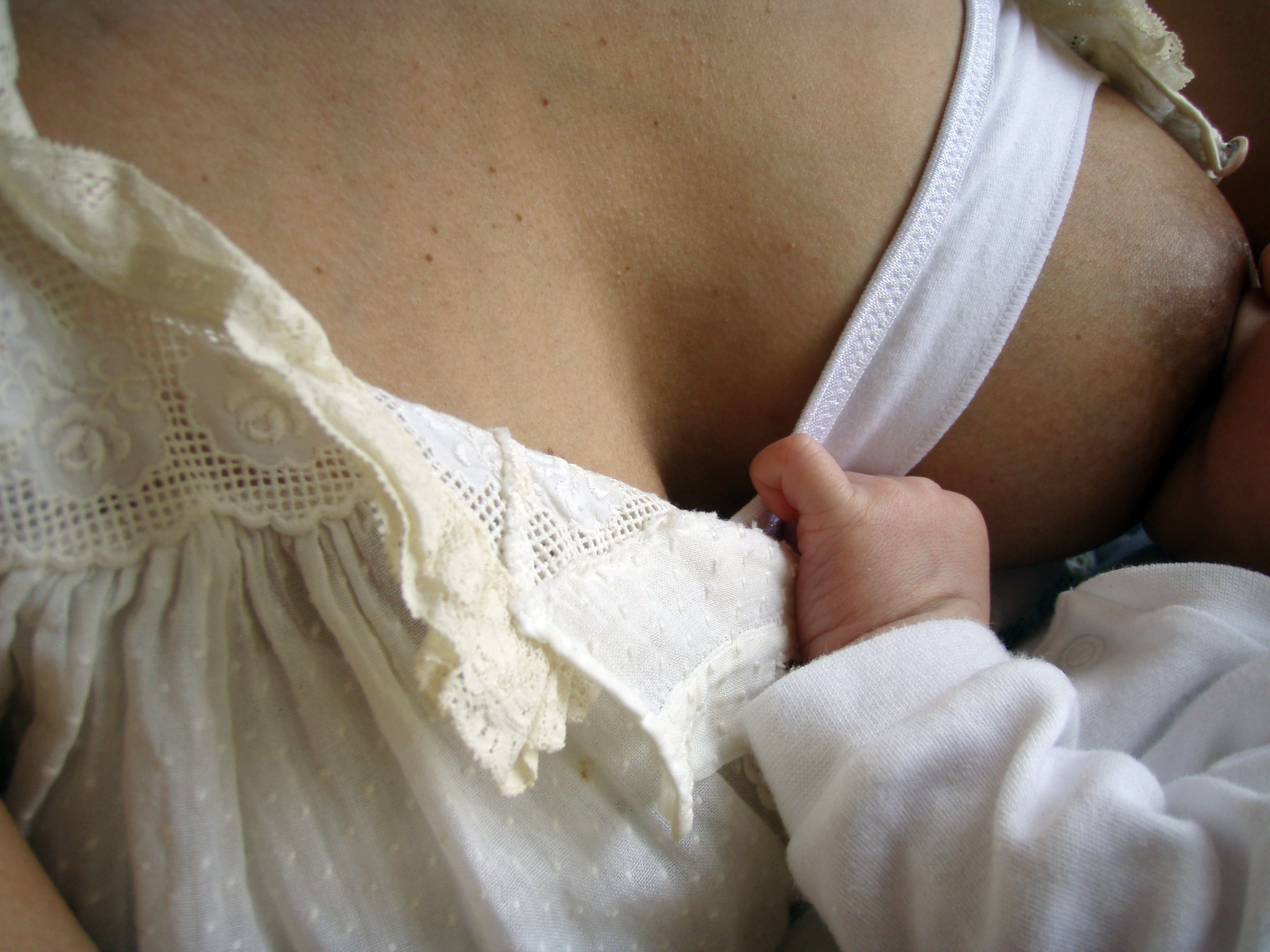
A new mother in a nursing bra as she breastfeeds her infant.

A nursing bra is a specialised brassiere that provides additional support to lactating women, and permits comfortable breastfeeding without the need to remove the bra. This is accomplished by specially designed bra cups that include flaps which can be opened with one hand to expose the nipple. The flap is usually held closed with a simple clasp or hook.

== Purpose ==
A nursing bra is designed to provide quick and easy access to the breast for the purpose of breastfeeding an infant. It typically has flaps or panels that can be unclipped and folded down or to the side with one hand. Nursing bras can be worn under a variety of outer garments.

=== Changes during pregnancy ===
Measurements for an appropriate nursing bra can be performed by a lactation consultant. Women can choose nursing bras with strong side and undercup support and an extra-wide back for optimal support. Nursing bras usually have up to four rows of hooks in the rear closure to allow the people to adjust their band size to a limited extent. Experts recommend a soft-cup bra made of a blend of cotton and Lycra with cups that stretch to accommodate changes in breast size. Most women who get them buy two or more nursing bras so they can alternate between them. Small-breasted people who do not usually wear a bra may choose to wear a nursing bra to support their larger breasts or simply to prevent milk from leaking onto their clothes. Pregnant women should consider buying a maternity bra as soon as their regular bras begin feeling uncomfortable or notice their breasts are changing. This is normally around the 4 months mark.

=== Breast sizes change ===
A woman's breasts grow during pregnancy, usually 1 to 2 cup sizes, and potentially several cup sizes. A woman who wore a C-cup bra prior to her pregnancy may need to buy a larger bra while nursing. Once the baby is born and about 50 to 73 hours after birth, the mother will experience her breasts filling with milk (sometimes referred to as “milk coming in”) and at that point changes in the breast happen very quickly. Once lactation begins, the woman's breasts swell significantly and can feel achy, lumpy and heavy (which is referred to as engorgement).

=== Changes during nursing ===
To provide proper support and fit, to facilitate nursing, and to avoid engorged breasts or other complications that prevent an infant from nursing effectively, it is important to wear nursing bras that fit well. When a woman wears a bra that is too tight, her milk supply may be reduced, and she can experience plugged milk ducts and an extremely painful infection called mastitis. Mastitis can physically and emotionally affect the mother's ability to breastfeed.

== Types of nursing bras ==
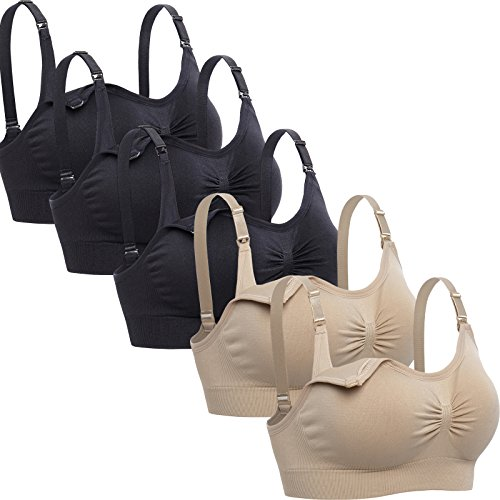
Nursing bras

There are an increasing variety of nursing bra designs, including softcup, underwire, seamless, and lounging styles. Some nursing bras can also serve as a sports bra, allowing a nursing parent to exercise more easily. Some outerwear like tank tops and T-shirts have nursing bras that are built into the garment, and there are also padded and plus-size nursing bras. Some experts advise against wearing an underwire nursing bra because they can restrict the flow of milk and cause mastitis. Most nursing bras have traditionally been white, but manufacturers now offer an increasing selection of colors and styles, including brown, teal, floral, and floral animal prints, and some are accessorized with lace and ribbon.

Different manufacturers use different methods for fastening the flap to the cup, including squeeze, snaps, clasps and hooks. Most nursing bras are designed with cup flaps that fasten at the apex of the bra, at the point where the shoulder straps attach, allowing the mother to simply pull the top half of the cup down to facilitate access to the nipple. Other designs include flaps that fasten between the cups at the center of the bra, zippers under each cup, and a cross-over design that allows the wearer to slip their breast out. Experts recommend that before buying a nursing bra, people should try on the bra and experiment with opening the flap with one hand. Some designs utilizing stretchable fabric are suitable for smaller-breasted people, allowing them to pull the entire bra up over the breast to facilitate nursing.

Experts recommend nursing bras that are stretchy, absorbent, and don't bind the breasts in any way that could interfere with milk flow. People are recommended to wear a bra that is 100 percent cotton or a cotton-Lycra blend or other stretchy synthetic. It is not necessary to wear a bra at night, although if a person's breasts leak excessively, they can wear a loose tanktop at night.

== Bras and breastfeeding ==
Choosing a functional nursing bra is important to help the parent feel comfortable nursing in various circumstances. In some Western cultures, while nearly nude or nude breasts are displayed openly on beaches and in magazines and movies, there is a taboo against showing breasts in public during breastfeeding.

== History ==
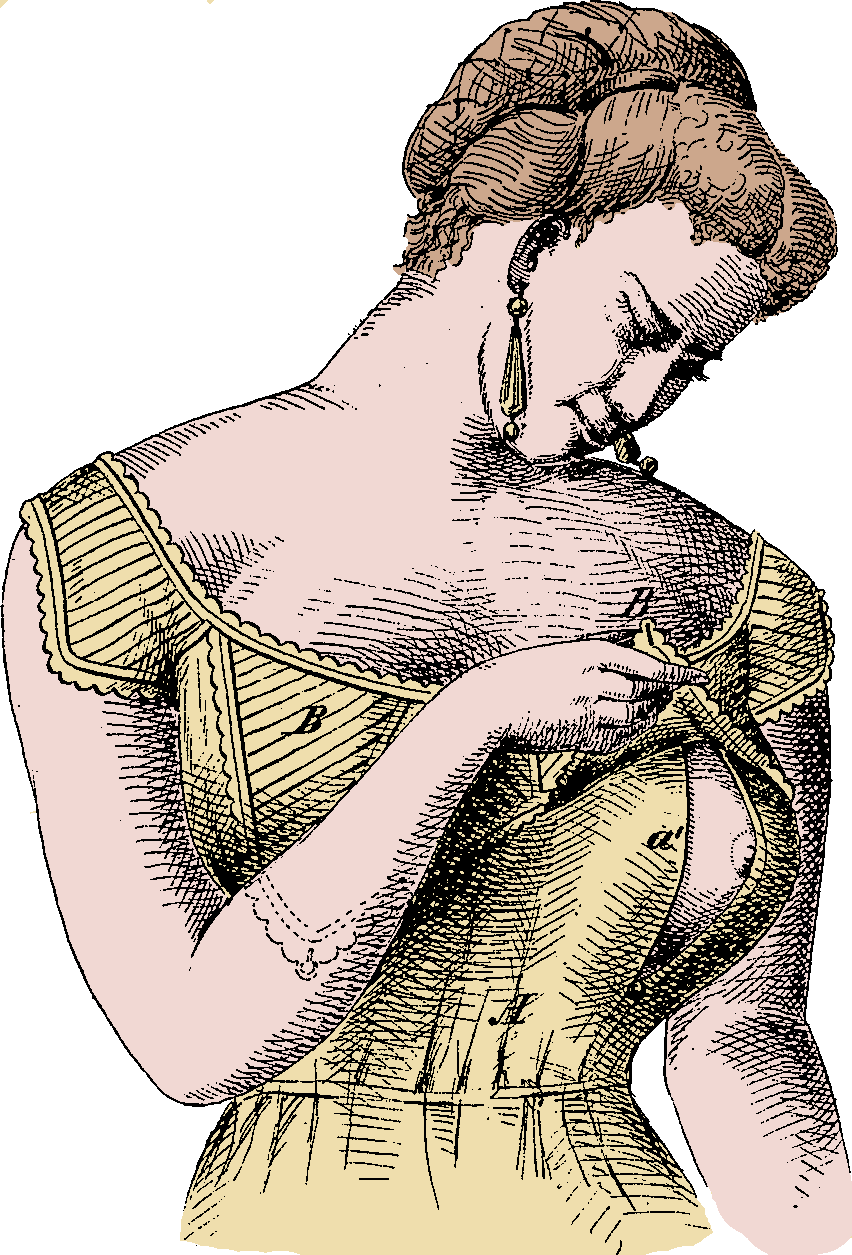
An 1872 nursing chemise shows a movable flap that allows access for breastfeeding

The first US patent for a bra was granted in 1913 to Mary Phelps Jacob. Her invention is the most widely recognized as the predecessor to the modern bra and consequently the nursing bra.

In October 1932, the S.H. Camp and Company correlated breast size and the degree they sag to letters of the alphabet, A, B, C, and D. Camp's advertising featured letter-labeled profiles of breasts in the February 1933 issue of Corset and Underwear Review. These procedures were only designed to help women with the then-standard sizes A through D up to a size 38 band size and were not intended to be used for larger-breasted women. In 1937, Warner began to feature cup sizing in its products. Other companies like the Model and Fay-Miss (renamed in 1935 as the Bali Brassiere Company) also began to offer A, B, C and D cups in the late 1930s. Catalog companies continued to use the designations Small, Medium and Large through the 1940s. In the 1930s, Dunlop chemists were able to reliably transform rubber latex into elastic thread. Man-made fibres were quickly adopted by the industry because of their easy-care properties. Since a brassiere must be laundered frequently, this was of great importance. In 1937, Warners added cup sizes (A, B, C and D) to their product line, and other manufacturers gradually followed, but Britain did not take up the American standard until the 1950s. Maidenform introduced brassieres with seamless cups in 1933, but resisted using cup sizes for its products until 1949.

=== Innovations and patents ===
The first patent for a device called a "nursing brassiere" was obtained in 1943 by Albert A. Glasser. After World War II, the post-war baby boom stimulated a large increase in the market for nursing bras. Nursing bras saw little innovation for some time and the market was dominated by larger lingerie companies who would simply add a clip.

The nursing bra industry is very segmented. It includes traditional brassiere manufacturers such as Wonderbra. Their product is designed to accommodate the needs of women whose breast size can fluctuate up to a single cup size hourly while nursing. Another innovator is Mary Sanchez, who received a patent in 1991 for the one-handed fastening method and variable adjustment of cup size.

For those who pump their breast milk, specialised nursing bras are available that allow hands-free pumping.

== See also ==
- List of bra designs
