= Saf-t-Bra =

Hard plastic protective bra used by women war II workers

- Inception: 1943–1944
- Manufacturer: Willson Goggles
- Available: sizes 30 to 38, 39 to 44, and 45 to 48

Saf-t-Bra was a hard plastic brassiere introduced during World War II, to prevent injuries to the breasts of women war workers. It was produced by Willson Goggles.
