= Underwire bra =

Brassiere with curved wire inserts to support and define the breasts

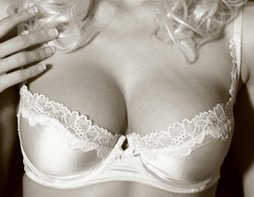
An underwire demi bra

An underwire bra (also under wire bra, under-wire bra, or underwired bra) is a brassiere that utilizes a thin, semi-circular strip of rigid material fitted inside the brassiere fabric to help lift, separate, shape, and support a woman's breasts. The wire may be made of metal, plastic, or resin. It is sewn into the bra fabric and under each cup, from the center gore to under the wearer's armpit. Many different brassiere designs incorporate an underwire, including shelf bras, demi bras, nursing bras, and bras built into other articles of clothing, such as tank tops, dresses and swimsuits.

The concept of an underwire can be traced to an 1893 patent that describes a breast supporting device using a rigid plate under the breasts for stability. The modern underwire bra was designed in the 1930s, and gained widespread popularity by the 1950s. As of 2005, underwire bras were the largest and fastest growing segment of the bra market. A bra without an underwire is a softcup bra.

Underwire bras are occasionally linked to health conditions including breast pain, mastitis, and metal allergies. Women wearing an underwire bra have in a few rare instances been subjected to extra scrutiny when their bra set off metal detectors at security checkpoints in airports or prisons. There have been a few recorded incidents where the underwire deflected a bullet or other weapon that struck the woman's chest.

== History ==
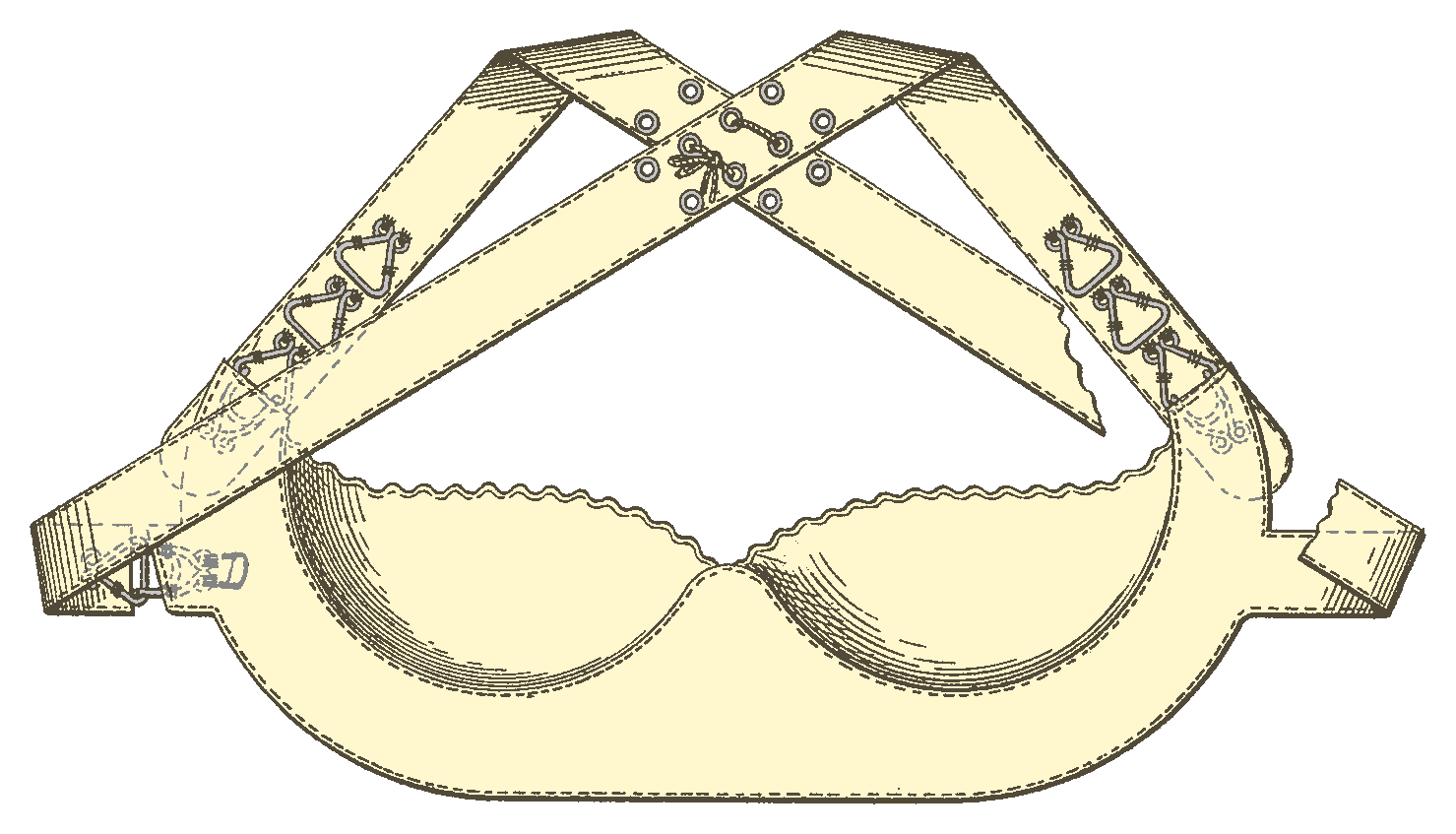
Marie Tucek's "Breast Supporter"

The precursor to the underwire bra can be traced back to at least 1893, when New Yorker Marie Tucek was granted a patent for a "breast supporter". The breast supporter was described as a modification of the corset, and was very similar to a modern push-up bra designed to support the breasts. It consisted of a plate made of metal, cardboard, or other stiff material, shaped to fit against the torso under the breasts, following the contour of the breasts. It was covered with silk, canvas, or other cloth, which extended above the plate to form a pocket for each breast. The plate curved around the torso and ended near the armpits, held in place and adjusted to a snug fit by shoulder straps that crossed the back, forming an X-shape. It was secured with hook-and-eye closures.

The underwire bra design emerged and took hold in the United States starting in the 1930s. Helene Pons received a patent in 1931 for a brassiere design that incorporated an "open-ended wire loop" that lay flat against the chest, encircling the bottom and sides of each breast. A 1932 patent describes a U-shaped piece of wire used between the cups to keep the breasts separated. A patent issued in 1938 to Pauline Boris describes a "breast support" which used pieces of wire to entirely encircle each breast. In 1940, Walter Emmett Williams was issued a patent which described a wire framework, shaped like a spiderweb, that encircles and covers each breast to provide support. Although development of the underwire bra started in the 1930s, it did not gain widespread popularity until the 1950s, when the end of World War II freed metal for domestic use.

In the 1940s, Howard Hughes had an underwire push-up bra designed for Jane Russell to emphasize her breasts in The Outlaw. According to Russell, the "ridiculous" contraption was painful and she secretly wore her own bra during the movie. The brassiere is now in a Hollywood museum.

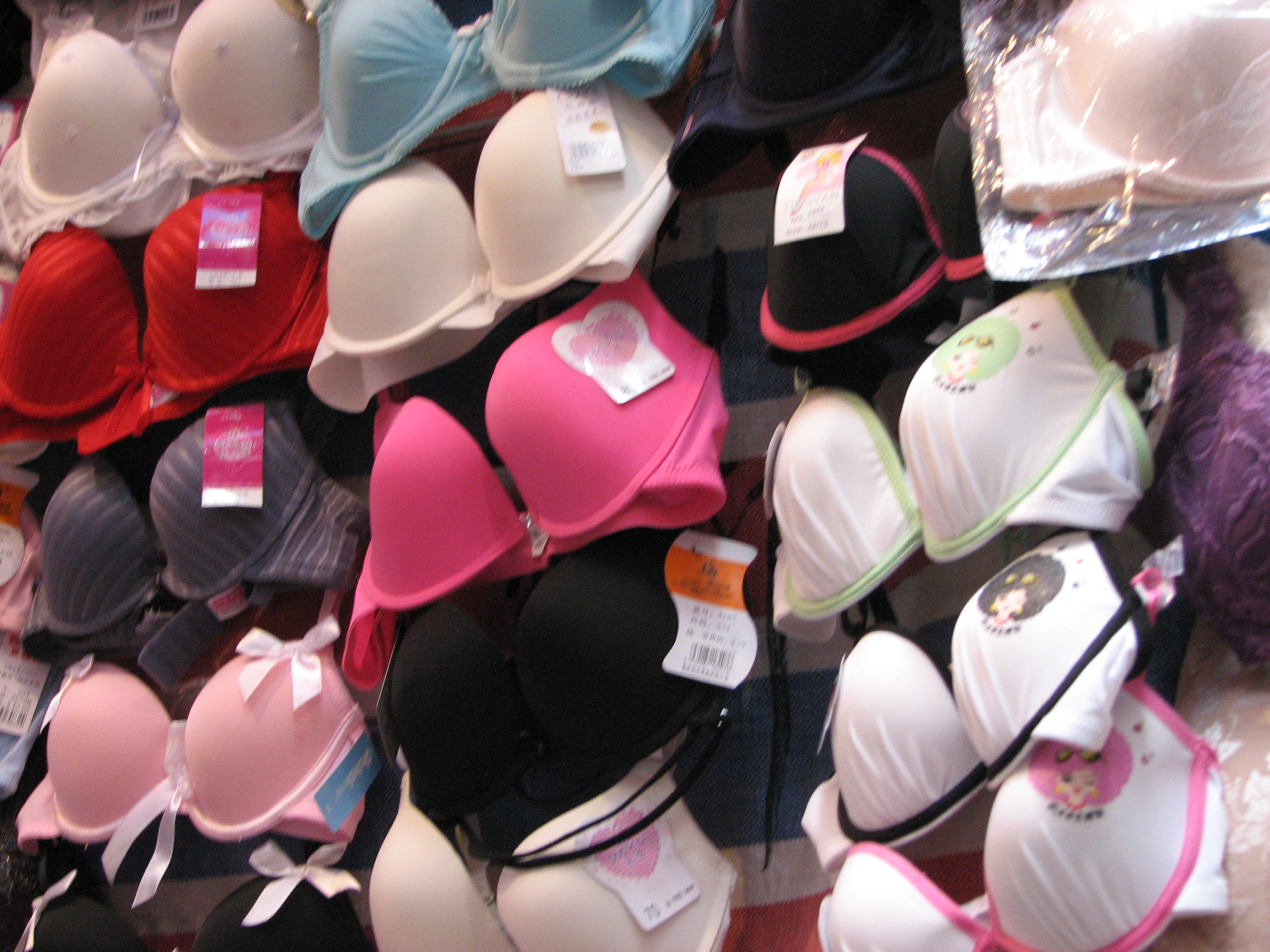
A selection of underwire bras in a retail store

With the popularity and widespread use of the underwire bra that started during the 1950s, the underwire was incorporated into many bra designs, and underwire bras were built into other articles of clothing. By 1990, Norma Kamali had incorporated underwire bras into both one- and two-piece (bikini) swimsuits. Scott Lucretia was granted a patent for a camisole with an integrated underwire bra in 1989.

Underwire bras accounted for 60% of the United Kingdom bra market in 2000 and 70% in 2005. In 2001, 500 million bras were sold in the United States, of which approximately 70% (350 million) were underwire bras. As of 2005, underwire bras were the fastest growing segment of the market.

== Underwire construction ==
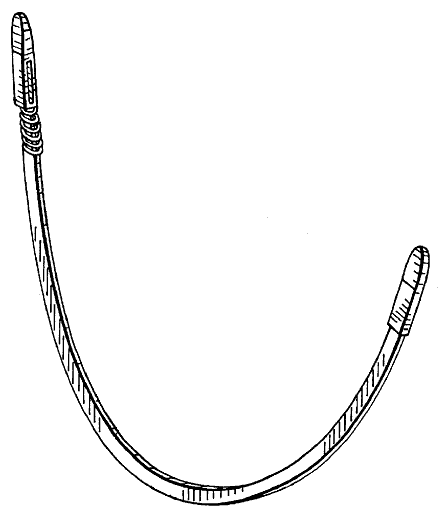
Underwire design in S & S Industries' patent

Underwire bras are built with a semi-circular "underwire", "bra wire", or "wire" embedded in the wire channel that circles the bottom and sides of each cup. One end, or head element, of the underwire is close to the front and center of the bra, and the other close to the armhole. The underwire can be made of metal or molded plastic; most are metallic. Plastic underwire has a very small share of the market because it does not provide the same support and rigidity offered by metal underwire. A metallic underwire is a thin strip of metal, usually with a nylon coating at both ends. Metals used include steel and nickel titanium, a shape memory alloy. According to underwire manufacturer S & S Industries of New York, which supplies underwire for bra makers such as Bali, Playtex, Vanity Fair, Victoria's Secret, Warner's, and other bra labels, about 70 percent of women who wear bras wear steel underwire bras.

Because underwire can tear through cloth, most women hand-wash underwire bras or machine-wash them on a delicate cycle. Bra wash bags, usually zippered mesh pouches, can also be used to protect bras and prevent the underwire from separating from the bra during machine washing.

=== 21st century patents ===
In 2002, S & S Industries obtained a patent for an underwire design that includes a spring-loaded plastic cushion tip on one or both ends. The spring is designed to keep the wire from poking through the bra. In 2008, Scott Dutton of Wales invented the "Bra Angel", a simple device to repair a bra when the underwire pops out of its channel. It is a barbed plastic cap that fits onto the end of the underwire, which is then inserted back into the bra and held in place by the barbs.

== Health ==
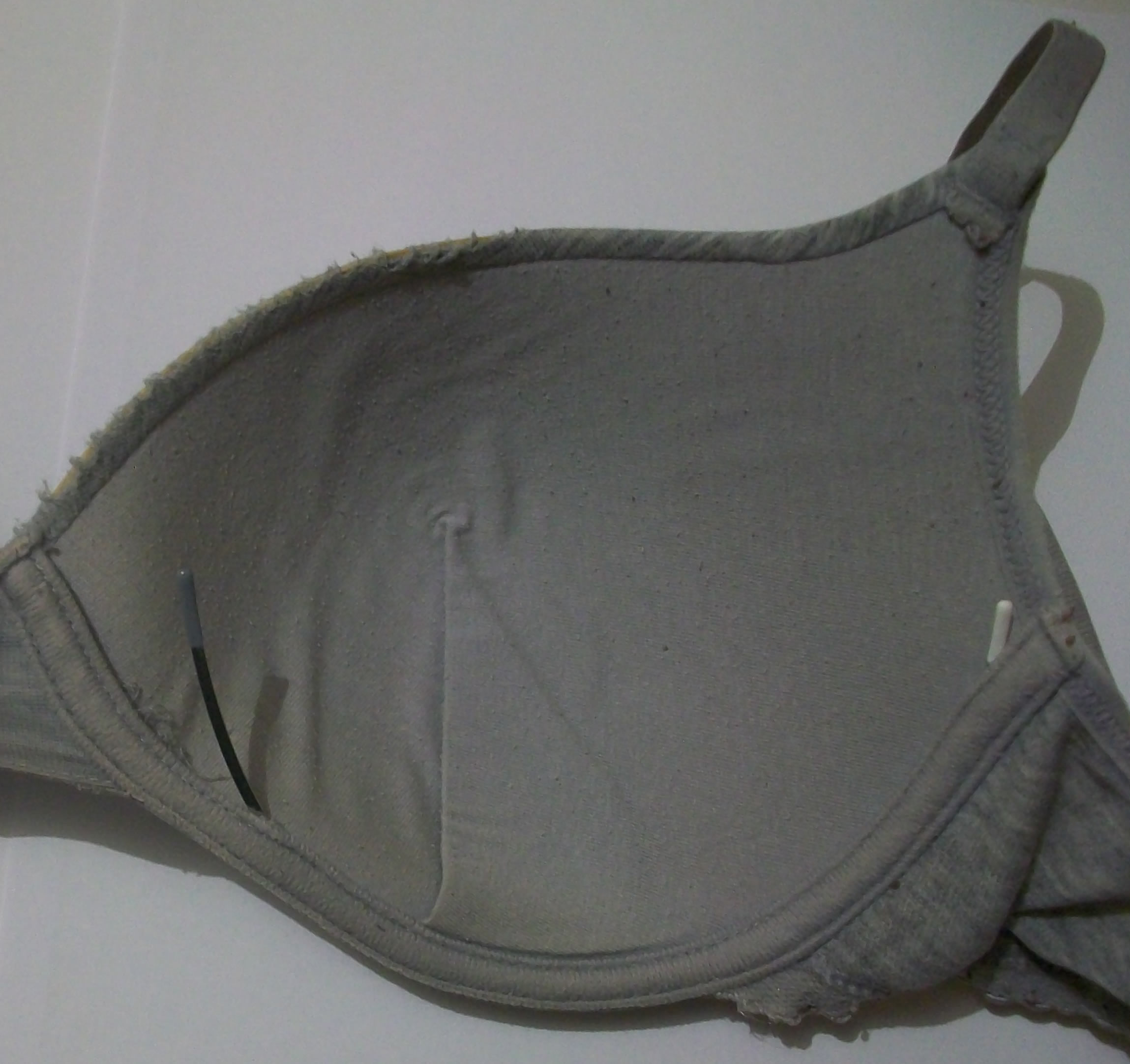
Metal underwire protruding from a worn bra

Underwire bras can rub and pinch the breast, causing skin irritation and breast pain, and the wire of a worn bra can protrude from the fabric and scrape or cut the skin. When the fabric of worn bra exposes an underwire, skin contact with nickel and other metals may cause contact dermatitis in some women.

=== Effect on lactation ===
Underwire bras, like other constrictive garments, may contribute to clogged milk ducts during the nursing period. Fluctuating breast size during pregnancy poses another problem. Because underwire bras are rigid, they do not easily accommodate changes in breast size, and an ill-fitting bra that does not support the breasts correctly can cause discomfort and pain. For several days after a mastectomy, or as long as the breast is tender, a woman is advised not to use an underwire bra.

=== Defibrillator use ===
Use of an automated external defibrillator on a patient in a metal underwire bra can cause burns, and the bra should be removed by the first responder before the AED is applied. In their 2007 season, the television program MythBusters tested the possibility of burns resulting from using a defibrillator on a patient who is using an underwire bra, and concluded that while it is possible, it is not likely unless the metal underwire is exposed and paddles of the defibrillator are very close to it.

== Legal issues ==
The United States Transportation Security Administration recommends that women do not wear underwire bras because they can set off metal detectors. Though most women travelers wear them without any problem, it can depend on the material of the underwire.

=== Transportation security ===
On Sunday, 24 August 2008, film maker Nancy Kates set off a metal detector during security screening. She objected when the agent attempted to pat-down her breasts. She said she told the agent, "'You can't treat me as a criminal for wearing a bra." A TSA supervisor told her she had to either submit to the pat-down search in a private room or not fly. Kates offered to take off her bra, which the TSA accepted. She went to the restroom, removed her bra, and walked through the airport and security screening braless. She said that a supervisor told her that underwire bras were the leading cause of metal detector false alarms.

In August 2010, cancer survivor Cathy Bossi, an on-duty flight attendant for U.S. Airways, was passing through security screening at Charlotte Douglas International Airport on the way to her next flight. Due to the radiation involved, she reluctantly passed through a full-body scanner. "The T.S.A. Agent told me to put my I.D. on my back," she said. "When I got out of there the agent said because my I.D. was on my back, I had to go to a personal screening area." During what she described as an "aggressive" pat-down search, security screening personnel forced her to remove and show her prosthetic breast. Their action violated TSA guidelines, which state that agents do not need to touch or inspect a mastectomy prosthetic.

In October, 2010, CNN employee Rosemary Fitzpatrick was subject to a personal search after her underwire bra set off a metal detector. The TSA security official applied an invasive "hand-sliding inspection" during which she "ran her hands around her breasts, over her stomach, buttocks and her inner thighs, and even touched her most private areas." Fitzpatrick said that she cried during the experience. "I felt helpless, I felt violated, and I felt humiliated."

In response, Triumph International, a Swiss company, launched what it called a "Frequent Flyer Bra" in late 2001. The bra uses metal-free clasps and underwires made of resin instead of metal that are guaranteed to not set off metal detectors. The bras were not available in the United States, and in 2004 a Canadian spokeswoman did not know whether they were still manufactured.

=== Correctional facility rules ===
Some correctional facilities, like San Quentin State Prison, require visitors to either cut their bras and remove the underwire, or temporarily use a soft cup bra provided by the institution before being granted entry. The result can be embarrassment and consternation for unsuspecting visitors. Other facilities require women to remove their underwire bras in a bathroom, pass through the metal detector, and return to the bathroom to put their bras back on.

In June 2010, attorney Britney Horstman was barred from visiting her client in the Federal Detention Center at Miami, Florida when her underwire bra set off the metal detector. Although she reminded guards of a detention center memo that permitted female attorneys visiting clients to wear an underwire bra, the guard refused her entry. That memo existed as a result of an agreement negotiated by the Federal Public Defender's Office, which represents inmates held at the institution before trial. That agreement allows female lawyers entry if her underwire bra is detected by a metal-detecting wand. Horstman removed her bra in a bathroom and returned to the security checkpoint braless, but was then turned away because she did not meet the facility's dress code. Horstman had previously worn an underwire bra into the facility without problems. Warden Linda McGrew later promised the incident would not happen again.

== Accidents and attacks ==
There have been several cases where the underwire from a bra has helped deflect bullets or other objects, saving the wearer's life.

In 1996, a girl was impaled on a railing and, according to hospital personnel, the underwire from her bra probably saved her life by helping deflect the spike from her heart. There have been multiple incidents where bullets were deflected by the underwire of a woman's bra, either keeping her entirely from harm, or directing the bullet away from the heart to another part of the body. One such incident occurred in 2004 when a stray bullet shot by a member of the Ghetto Boys hit the narrow metal wire in Helen Kelly's bra and was deflected away from her heart. In 2008, a robbery victim was saved from being stabbed in the chest when the attacker's knife was caught and deflected by the underwire of her bra.

== See also ==
- List of bra designs
- Lingerie
- Wonderbra
