= Nothing tastes as good as skinny feels =

Quote by English model Kate Moss

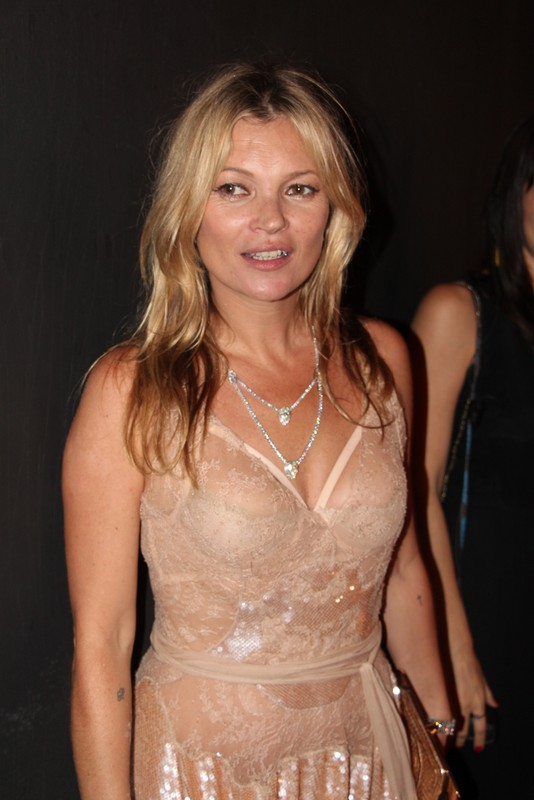
Moss in 2015

"Nothing tastes as good as skinny feels" is a quote popularised by English model Kate Moss, though she did not originate the phrase. Moss first publicly used the quote in a 2009 interview with Women's Wear Daily where she stated it was one of her mantras. The quote was immediately controversial, and subsequently used for pro-anorexia purposes. It has also been used for product marketing and been the focus of academic study. Moss later expressed regret for using the phrase.

== Background ==
Kate Moss entered the modelling scene in 1988 at 14 years old and quickly became known for her size zero frame. She is credited for helping to start the "heroin chic" look of the 1990s, a drug abuse-inspired fashion look.

In Bridget Carrington's book Feast or Famine? Food and Children's Literature, guest author Fiona Dunbar writes that the quote could be found on pro-anorexia websites as early as 2003. Moss stated when she started modelling and got roommates, one of them repeatedly used the phrase as a "little jingle". Moss then started using the mantra.

== Women's Wear Daily interview ==
On November 13, 2009, Women's Wear Daily released an interview with Moss under the article name "Kate Moss: The Waif That Roared". Brid Costello asked ten questions of the 35-year-old Moss, including her inspirations and definition of beauty. Asked if she had a motto, Moss answered:

There are loads. There’s "Nothing tastes as good as skinny feels." That's one of them. You try and remember, but it never works.

== Impact ==
After the interview was released, the quote "immediately caused an uproar" according to the BBC. HuffPost wrote, "The roar that WWD promised quickly materialised." Television presenter Denise van Outen quipped, "Kate Moss is talking out of her size zero backside." Susan Ringwood, the chief executive of the eating disorder awareness charity Beat, said, "For her to even inadvertently legitimise something that could be potentially so harmful is regrettable." Moss' representatives stated the quote was "taken out of context." CBS News named the quote one of the "Top 20 quotes of 2009", while Cosmopolitan included it in the listicle "The Most Insane Things Celebs Said This Year".

=== Pro-anorexia mantra ===
After the release of the interview, English model Katie Green stated, "There are 1.1 million eating disorders in the UK alone. Kate Moss's comments are likely to cause many more. If you read any of the pro-anorexia websites, they go crazy for quotes like this." That community, also known as "pro-ana", quickly started using the quote and applied it as "thinspo" and as one of their 10 mantras. The pro-ana website Starving for Control put it on their homepage. Author Lisabeth Kaeser recounted how she used the quote as a personal mantra when she was struggling with her eating disorder.

Writing for HuffPost in 2018, Katie Bishop stated, "For years the slogan infiltrated pro-anorexia forums, and even today a quick Google offers up pages of images of the words in Instagram-ready fonts against tasteful backgrounds of millennial pink."

=== Product slogan ===
In 2009, Time listed the quote as number six on their top 10 "T-shirt worthy slogans" with a graphic of Moss and the quote appearing on a black T-shirt.

In 2011, American custom apparel retailer Zazzle listed a user-uploaded children's T-shirt design bearing the logo. After the Advertising Standards Authority in the UK received complaints, the ASA required Zazzle to remove the advertisements featuring the shirts and censured the company.

In 2014, Canadian clothing retailer Hudson's Bay produced a shirt designed by Christopher Lee Sauvé featuring the quote with a nutrition label that listed the calorie count as 0. Customer Kathleen Pye saw the shirt in the store and posted a photo to Twitter, calling the shirt "unbelievably irresponsible". The company received an onslaught of criticism online, after which it announced it would pull the shirt from its stores and stop production.

In 2016, British variety retailer B&M sold a novelty scale for £3.99 with the quote printed on the product. A customer took a picture of the scale and uploaded it to Facebook, where it caused "outrage". B&M pulled the product and announced "We have asked our supplier to withdraw this particular quotation" from the scales.

=== Scholarly study ===
Researchers incorporated Moss' quote into their 2013 study of anorexia nervosa published by the journal Trends in Neurosciences; the article was titled "Nothing Tastes as Good as Skinny Feels: The Neurobiology of Anorexia Nervosa". In June 2017, Gemma Rose Cobb examined the phrase in her PhD dissertation for the University of Sussex, titled Critiquing the thin ideal in pro-anorexia online spaces. Elle compared the saying with the quote "You can never be too rich or too thin" by Wallis Simpson, Duchess of Windsor, as examples of "snappy one-liners" coming to define their speakers.

In his 2019 book First You Write a Sentence, social historian Joe Moran dissects the quote and examines its language in depth. He writes that while it is a "dubious message", it is a "well-turned sentence". In her 2013 book Digital Dieting, academic Tara Brabazon writes that instead of obesity being a public crisis, "excessive ignorance" is much worse, which she states is "so clearly revealed by Kate Moss" and the quote.

== Retraction ==
In a 2018 interview with journalist Megyn Kelly on NBC, Moss expressed regret for the quote. She further stated:

There's so much more diversity now, I think it's right. There's so many different sizes and colours and heights. Why would you just be a one-size model and being represented for all of these people? So yes, for sure, it's better.
