= Vanity sizing =

Increase in size of ready-to-wear clothing

Vanity sizing, or size inflation, is the phenomenon of ready-to-wear clothing of the same nominal size becoming bigger in physical size over time. This has been documented primarily in the United States and the United Kingdom. The use of US standard clothing sizes by manufacturers as the official guidelines for clothing sizes was abandoned in 1983. In the United States, although clothing size standards exist (i.e., ASTM), most companies do not use them any longer.

Size inconsistency has existed since at least 1937. In Sears' 1937 catalog, a size 14 dress had a bust size of 32 inches (81 cm). In 1967, the same bust size was a size 8. In 2011, it was a size 0. Some argue that vanity sizing is designed to satisfy wearers' wishes to appear thin and feel better about themselves. This works by adhering to the theory of compensatory self-enhancement, as vanity sizing promotes a more positive self-image upon seeing a smaller label.

In the 2000s, American designer Nicole Miller introduced size 0 because of its strong California presence and to satisfy the request of many Asian American customers in that state. Her brand introduced subzero sizes for naturally petite women. However, the increasing size of clothing with the same nominal size caused Nicole Miller to introduce size 0, 00, or subzero sizes.

The UK's Chief Medical Officer has suggested that vanity sizing has contributed to the normalisation of obesity in society.

In 2003, a study that measured over 1,000 pairs of women's pants found that pants from more expensive brands tended to be larger than those from cheaper brands with the same nominal size.

== US pattern sizing measurements: 1931–2015 ==
Pattern sizes – Du Barry / Woolworth (1931–1955)
5 ft 3 in–5 ft 6 in tall, average: bust (3 in < hips), waist (9 in < hips)
Dimension/size	10	11	12	13	14	15	16	18	20	40
Bust	28	29	30	31	32	33	34	36	38	40
Waist	23	23.5	24	25	26	27	28	30	32	34
Hip	31	32	33	34	35	36	37	39	41	43

Pattern sizes – McCalls (1947)
5 ft 3 in–5 ft 6 in tall, average: bust (3 in < hips), waist (8-9 in < hips)
Dimension/size	12	14	16	18	20	40	42	44	46
Bust	30	32	34	36	38	40	42	44	46
Waist	25	26 1/2	28	30	32	34	38	38	40
Hip	33	35	37	39	41	43	45	47	49

Pattern sizes – DuBarry / Woolworth (1956–1967)
5 ft 3 in–5 ft 6 in tall, average: bust (2 in < hips), waist (9–10 in < hips)
Dimension/size	9	10	11	12	13	14	15	16	18	20
Bust	30.5	31	31.5	32	33	34	35	36	38	40
Waist	23.5	24	24.5	25	25.5	26	27	28	30	32
Hip	32.5	33	33.5	34	35	36	37	38	40	42

Pattern sizes – DuBarry / Woolworth (1968–present)
5 ft 3 in–5 ft 6 in tall, average: bust (2 in < hips), waist (9 in–10 in < hips)
Dimension/size	4	6	8	10	12	14	16	18	20	22	24
Bust	29.5	30.5	31.5	32.5	34	36	38	40	42	44	46
Waist	22	23	24	25	26.5	28	30	32	34	37	39
Hip	31.5	32.5	33.5	34.5	36	38	40	42	44	46	48

== US misses standard sizing measurements: 1958–2011 ==
Misses' sizes (CS 215-58) (1958)
5 ft 3 in–5 ft 6 in tall, regular hip
Dimension/size	8	10	12	14	16	18	20	22
Bust	31	32 1/2	34	35 1/2	37	39	41	43
Waist	23 1/2	24 1/2	25 1/2	27	28 1/2	30 1/2	32 1/2	34 1/2
Hip	32 1/2	34	36	38	40	42	44	46

Misses' sizes (PS 42-70) (1970)
5 ft 2 1/2 in–5 ft 6 1/2 in tall, average bust, average back
Dimension/size	6	8	10	12	14	16	18	20	22
Bust	31 1/2	32 1/2	33 1/2	35	36 1/2	38	40	42	44
Waist	22 1/2	23 1/2	24 1/2	26	27 1/2	29	31	33	35
Hip	33 1/2	34 1/2	35 1/2	37	38 1/2	40	42	44	46
Back-waist length	14 1/2	15	15 1/4	15 1/2	15 3/4	16	16 1/4	16 1/2	16 3/4

Misses' sizes (ASTM D5585 95(R2001)) (1995, revised 2001)
5 ft 3 1/2 in–5 ft 8 in tall
Dimension/size	2	4	6	8	10	12	14	16	18	20
Bust	32	33	34	35	36	37 1/2	39	40 1/2	42 1/2	44 1/2
Waist	24	25	26	27	28	29 1/2	31	32 1/2	34 1/2	36 1/2
Hip	34 1/2	35 1/2	36 1/2	37 1/2	38 1/2	40	41 1/2	43	45	47

Misses' sizes (ASTM D5585 11e1) (2011)
5 ft 5 1/2 in tall
Dimension/size	00	0	2	4	6	8	10	12	14	16	18	20
Bust	31 1/8	31 3/4	33	34 1/8	35 1/4	36 1/4	37 1/4	38 3/4	40 3/8	42 1/8	44	46
Waist (Straight)	25 3/8	26 1/8	26 7/8	27 5/8	28 1/2	29 1/2	30 1/2	32 1/4	34	36	38 1/4	40 1/2
Waist (Curvy)	23 7/8	24 5/8	25 3/8	26 1/8	27	28	29	30 3/4	32 1/2	34 1/2	36 3/4	39
Hip (Straight)	33 1/4	33 7/8	35 1/8	36 3/8	37 1/2	38 1/2	39 1/2	41	42 1/2	44 1/4	46	48
Hip (Curvy)	34	34 5/8	35 7/8	37 1/8	38 1/4	39 1/4	40 1/4	41 3/4	43 1/4	45	46 3/4	48 3/4

== Men's clothing ==
Although more common in women's apparel, vanity sizing occurs in men's clothing as well. For example, men's pants are traditionally marked with two numbers, "waist" (waist circumference) and "inseam" (distance from the crotch to the hem of the pant). While the nominal inseam is fairly accurate, the nominal waist may be quite a bit smaller than the actual waist, in US sizes. In 2010, Abram Sauer of Esquire measured several pairs of dress pants with a nominal waist size of 36 in (91 cm) at different US retailers and found that actual measurements ranged from 37 to 41 in (94 to 104 cm). The phenomenon has also been noticed in the United Kingdom, where a 2011 study found misleading labels on more than half of checked items of clothing. In that study, the worst offenders understated waist circumferences by 1.5 to 2 inches (3.8 to 5.1 cm). London-based market analyst Mintel say that the number of men reporting varying waistlines from store to store doubled between 2005 and 2011.

== Effects on consumers ==
Vanity sizing is a common fashion industry practice used today that often involves labeling clothes with smaller sizes than their actual measurements size. Experts believe that this practice targets consumer's preferences and perceptions. Although it may seem like a marketing tactic to boost sales, it potentially has an impact that affects consumers' psychological well-being, purchasing behavior tendencies, and self-image perceptions.

Research studies show that vanity sizing is a key factor in a consumer's ideal body image and self-esteem. The study claims that smaller-size labels can promote more positive mental imagery about one's self-image, viewing oneself as thinner and more attractive. One example that the article provides is a hypothetical situation when presented with two t-shirts that look the same, with the only difference being the size, one labeled medium and one labeled a size large. The article explains that consumers would be more willing to pick the t-shirt labeled medium because it makes them feel better about their figure. "'Consumers' decisions are influenced by framing; that is, the way that the good is presented to the consumers.'" However, this may depend on an individual's self-esteem about their appearance; those with lower self-esteem prefer small labels more. In another article, five studies were conducted, and all concluded that larger clothing sizes had a more negative response from consumers.

Nevertheless, it is also important to consider the impact of vanity sizing on the plus-size women community. Finding clothes that fit and match personal style is challenging for this group of women. In an academic paper that analyzes the marketing for the plus-size community, the author mentions that "For most retailers plus size consumers are not their main target market unless they exclusively sell plus size clothes. But for the most part plus size consumers do fit into some kind of target market on every other attribute except for sizing." This can be frustrating for this community, making this group feel excluded and showing the ethical issues of not being able to provide a market for different communities. In another article that focuses on the plus-size community's satisfaction with retail clothing, the author states, "Additionally, 62% of plus-size women experience difficulty finding desirable clothing styles, and 56% report that it is challenging to find good quality plus-size clothing."

Vanity sizing creates difficulties for women at the smallest end of the size range. As nominal size labels have shifted downwards across the industry, many retailers have narrowed or eliminated their smallest sizes. Small sizes are often intentionally understocked because retailers can more easily sell excess mid-range inventory than excess extra-small inventory. Even when the smallest sizes are available, vanity sizing means the actual measurements attached to labels like XS or 00 have grown larger over time. Industry sourcing indicates that the smallest women's size offered by Sears in 1930 carried a 31-inch bust measurement, while by 2009, the smallest size available had a 32.5-inch bust measurement. For women whose bodies are small or underweight, finding clothing that is both sufficiently small and features the appropriate proportions can be difficult. "Petite" lines are designed to address height rather than slimness, and, unlike plus-size clothing, no dedicated retail category catering to very small sizes exists. This leaves thinner women with few options and pushes many to shop in children's or teen departments instead.

Not only does vanity sizing play a part in how consumers view themselves, but it can also be a factor in shaping a consumer's purchasing habits. Oftentimes, consumers lean toward clothing labels with smaller sizes based on how those clothes complement their figure. Retailers may incorporate vanity sizing practices, which can sometimes result in particular consumers having more appeal towards smaller sizes. Another study tests whether perceived deception is connected between a consumer's cynicism and a consumer's outcomes. The article discusses how wearing vanity sizes boosts consumers' self-esteem and adds value to the product that would not have been in those labeled in the actual size. Larger clothing sizes may influence consumers to purchase more clothing items to improve their self-esteem. However, there are times when people buy clothes, they might choose bigger sizes to feel better about themselves. The flip side of vanity sizing was concluded from their study, which showed that this only sometimes stops people from buying clothes. It can make people want to spend more money overall because they want to feel better about themselves, and buying clothes can help. This vanity sizing concept suggests that perhaps there is a connection between shopping habits and one's ideal body figure.

Customers may lose trust in clothing brands if they feel they have been deceived by vanity sizing.. Inaccurate size labels can be particularly problematic for consumers buying clothes online, where they cannot be physically tried on prior to purchase. Poorly fitting garments then have to be returned, leading to inconvenience for customers.

== See also ==
- Body image
- The Association for Women with Large Feet
- EN 13402, emerging European and international clothing standard from 2007, based on body measurements in centimeters
- US standard clothing size, an inch based standard based on body measurements, gained little traction and was replaced by vanity sizing from the 1980s
- Inclusive sizing
