= Size zero =

US women's clothing size

Size zero or size 0 is a women's clothing size in the US catalog sizes system. Size 0 and 00 were established due to enlarged body sizes and the subsequent assignment of lower measurement numbers for clothing sizes over time (referred to as vanity sizing or size inflation). For example, a 2011 size 0 is equivalent to a 2001 size 2, and is larger than a 1970 size 6 or 1958 size 8. Despite their higher numbers, these past equivalents were still the smallest available sizes at the time. Modern size 0 clothing, depending on brand and style, fits measurements of chest-stomach-hips from 30-22-32 inches (76-56-81 cm) to 33-25-35 inches (84-64-89 cm). Size 00 can be anywhere from 0.5 to 2 inches (1 to 5 cm) smaller than size 0. The term size zero can refer to thin people (especially women and adolescent girls), or trends associated with them.

== Criticism ==
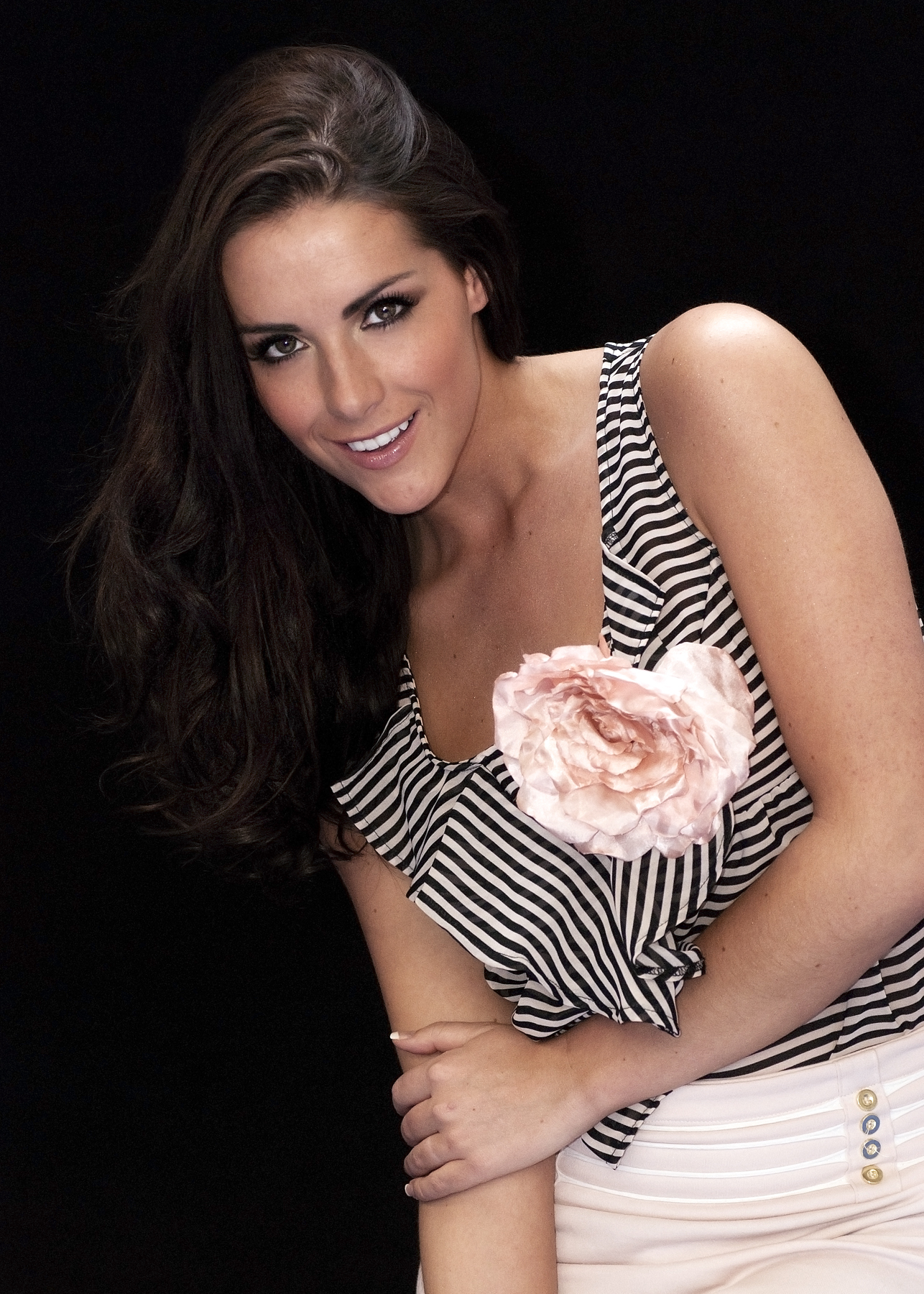
Katie Green, who initiated a campaign against size-zero modeling

The use of size 0 in advertisements and products of the clothing industry has been met with some media attention. In July 2009, Katie Green won a competition to represent Wonderbra. They referred her to the Premier Model Management agency for representation. Green reported that "one of the guys from the PR agency from Wonderbra" insisted that she lose weight, that it wasn't normal for models to be a (UK) size 8. "Unless I could drop down to that weight, they wouldn't be willing to get me more work." Green at first complied, but then quit the agency. She then, with Liberal Democrat MP Lembit Öpik, launched a campaign titled "Say No to Size Zero". They began a petition drive with the goal to put an end to size zero and underweight models on the catwalk or working in the fashion industry. They set a goal to obtain 20,000 signatures and plan to present it to the UK Prime Minister and Parliament. They are campaigning for legislation that would require regular health checkups for all models before undertaking any assignments.

== Movement against size zero ==
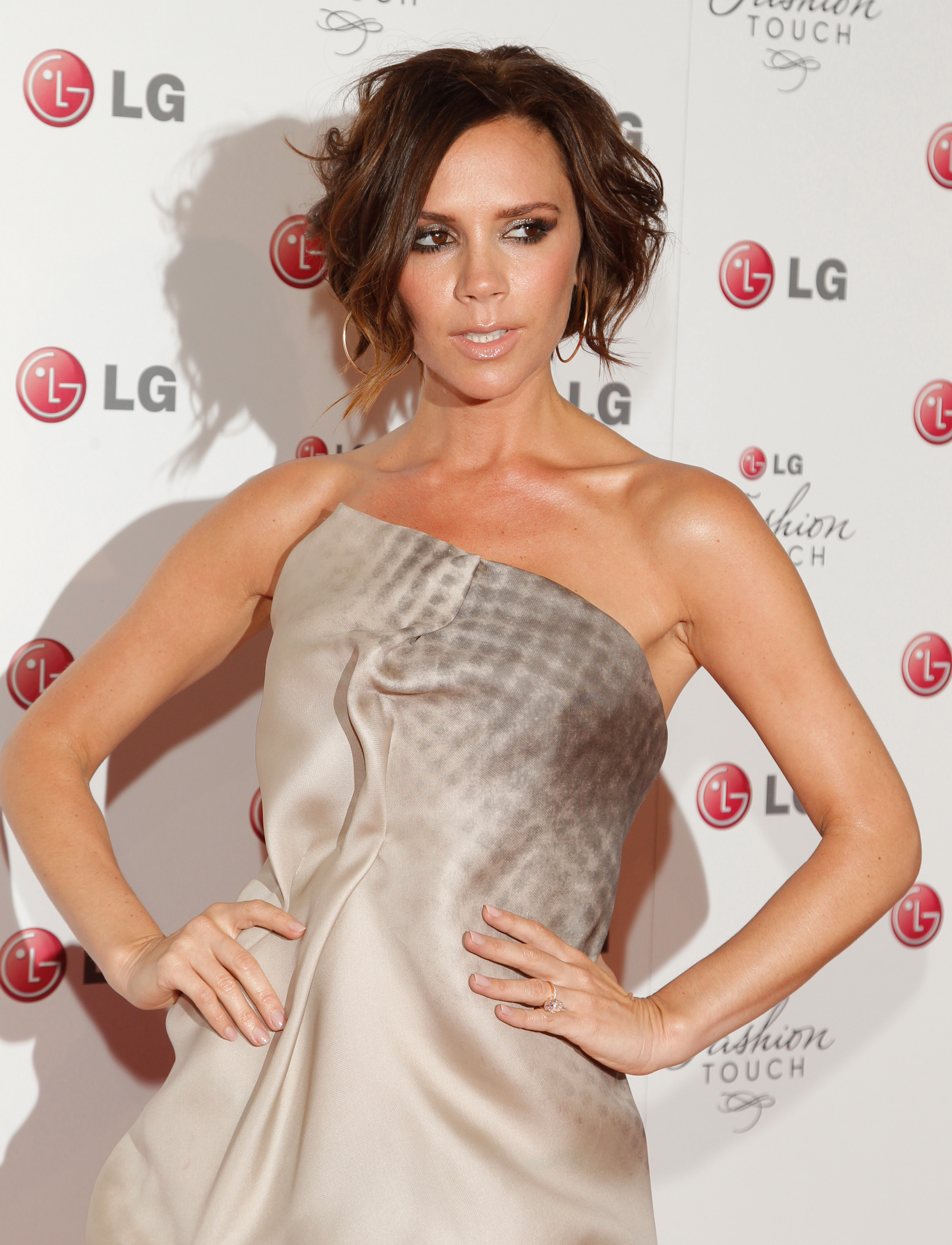
Victoria Beckham hosting the LG Mobile Phone Touch Event, in 2010

After the death of Luisel Ramos from anorexia in August, 2006, Madrid Fashion Week banned size-zero models the following month, and the Milan fashion show took the same action shortly afterward, banning models with a body mass index (BMI) of 18 or below. As a result, five models were banned from taking part.

As of 2007, the British Fashion Council promoted the creation of a task force to establish guidelines for the fashion industry. They also urged fashion designers to use healthy models. In September 2019, Victoria Beckham received criticism on social media over thin models who appeared "ill" in her Fall fashion show. In 2015 she had "vowed that her agents were in touch with the agents of all the models she uses in an effort to make sure that the women are healthy". Representatives for Beckham did not respond to Fox News’s request for comment.

Italian fashion labels Prada, Versace and Armani have agreed to ban size-zero models from their catwalks. Under the new self-regulation code drawn up in Italy by the government and designers, all models in future shows will be "full-bodied", and larger sizes will be introduced at shows. Fashion designer Giorgio Armani has given support to the effort to eliminate ultra-thin models. "The time has now come for clarity. We all need to work together against anorexia."

France banned size-zero models by law stipulating that models needed a doctor’s note attesting to their health in regards to their age, weight and body shape. The new charter brought forth by the iconic fashion companies take the 2015 legislation further, committing their brands to banning models who are smaller than size 34 for women and 44 for men (for reference, a French size 34 is roughly equivalent to a size 0 in the US). Paris fashion week has also banned size-zero models from their catwalks. Kering and LVMH, parent company of brands like Christian Dior, Louis Vuitton, Yves Saint Laurent and Givenchy have created a new charter that bans the hiring of excessively thin models. The CEO of Kering, Francois-Henri Pinault spoke of the decision, “We hope to inspire the entire industry to follow suit, thus making a real difference in the working conditions of fashion models industry-wide."

Israel banned underweight models in March 2012. Their law stipulates that women and men hired as models must be certified by a physician as having a body mass index (BMI) of no less than 18.5. The legislation also requires the inclusion of an informational note in adverts using photos manipulated to make models look thinner. There were divergent views on the ban within the Israeli fashion industry. One modelling agent, who had helped promote the bill, suggested that the fall in typical dress sizes for models in the preceding 15–20 years amounted to "the difference between death and life". However, another described the law as "arbitrary" and "not appropriate for every model".

== See also ==
- EN 13402, a partially adopted centimeter-based standard for labelling clothes, which aims to make it easier to find and select fitting clothes resulting in fewer returns
- Female body shape
- Body image
- Clothing sizes
