= Petite size =

Standard clothing size based on height

In fashion and clothing, a petite size is a standard clothing size designed specifically for women 163 cm (5 ft 4 in) and under. This categorization is not solely based on a woman's height, but also takes into account the proportions of her body. Petite sizes cater to body shapes that typically have shorter limb lengths, narrower shoulder. This standard is predominantly recognized in the U.S., but is also utilized in some other regions around the world.

Many clothing stores, including both specialty boutiques and major retail chains, offer a range of petite sized styles to accommodate the needs of women 163 cm (5 ft 4 in) or shorter. These styles aim to provide a better fit than regular sizes, which are often tailored based on the proportions of taller individuals. Petite clothing may include tops, bottoms, dresses, and outerwear, as well as specialty items like petite activewear and swimwear. Some brands also offer petite plus sizes, catering to women who are both shorter in height and larger in body size.

== Frequency ==
The average height of an American woman is roughly between 5 ft 4 in (1.63 m) and 5 ft 5 in (1.65 m). In the UK and throughout Europe the average height of a woman is around 5 ft 4 in (1.63 m) to 5 ft 6 in (1.68 m).

== History ==
The word 'petite' is the feminine form of French adjective petit, which translates to 'small' or 'short' in English.

Petite sizing originated in the 1940s when US fashion designer Hannah Troy noticed that many women did not fit into standard size clothing. She studied the measurements of women who had completed military service during World War II and found that only 8% fit the proportions of standard sizing, with most women being 'short in the waist'. She developed a clothing range called 'Troyfigure', which was based on a 'junior' fit but with a more mature style. This range became very popular and is considered the beginning of petite fashion. The word 'petite' was chosen by Troy because it "just had a nice ring to it"

== See also ==
- Children's clothing
- Clothing sizes
- U.S. standard clothing size
- Joint European standard for size labelling of clothes, formally EN 13402
