= Wannarexia =

Person who claims or wishes to have anorexia nervosa, but does not

Wannarexia, or anorexic yearning, is a label applied to someone who claims to have anorexia nervosa, or wishes they did, but does not. These individuals are also called wannarexics, "wanna-be anas" or "anorexic wannabes". The neologism wannarexia is a portmanteau of the latter two terms. It may be used as a pejorative term.

Wannarexia is a cultural phenomenon and has no diagnostic criteria. Wannarexia is more commonly, but not always, found in teenagers who feel the need to lose weight and think that anorexia will solve their dissatisfaction with their appearance, and is likely caused by a combination of cultural and media influences.

Many people who actually suffer from the eating disorder anorexia are angry, offended, or frustrated about wannarexia. Eating disorders are about using food to cope with life distress and poor body image, and they have very complex underlying causes. People with eating disorders might use weight as a measure of self-worth, and they often derive pleasure from losing weight while it does not feel enough. The notion of "wannarexic" is a potentially dangerous invalidation of eating disorders that are not specified based on the BMI criteria of the DSM. This can cause those labeled as "wannarexic" to feel as though they are not sick enough, which may cause the development or worsening of an eating disorder.

Wannarexics may be inspired or motivated by the pro-anorexia, or pro-ana, community that often promotes or supports anorexia as a lifestyle choice rather than an eating disorder. Some participants in pro-ana web forums only want to associate with "real anorexics" and will shun wannarexics who only diet occasionally, and are not dedicated to the "lifestyle" full-time. Community websites for anorexics and bulimics have posted advice to wannarexics saying that they do not want their "warped perspectives and dangerous behaviour to affect others."

Kelsey Osgood uses the label in her book How To Disappear Completely: On Modern Anorexia where she describes wannarexia as "a gateway drug for teenagers".
