= Clothing sizes =

Label sizes used for garments sold off-the-shelf

Examples of body measurements used for the sizing of clothes

Clothing sizes are the sizes with which garments sold off-the-shelf are labeled. Sizing systems vary based on the country and the type of garment, such as dresses, tops, skirts, and trousers. There are three approaches:

- Body dimensions: The label states the range of body measurements for which the product was designed. For example: hat label stating "head girth: 56–60 cm".
- Product dimensions: The label states characteristic dimensions of the product. (For example: jeans label stating inner leg length of the jeans in centimetres or inches (not inner leg measurement of the intended wearer).)
- Ad hoc sizes: The label states a size number or code with no obvious relationship to any measurement. (For example: Size 12, XL.) Children's clothes sizes are sometimes described by the age of the child, or, for infants, the weight.

Traditionally, clothes have been labelled using many different ad hoc size systems, which has resulted in varying sizing methods between different manufacturers made for different countries due to changing demographics and increasing rates of obesity, a phenomenon known as vanity sizing. This results in country-specific and vendor-specific labels incurring additional costs, and can make internet or mail order difficult. Some new standards for clothing sizes being developed are therefore based on body dimensions, such as the EN 13402 "Size designation of clothes".

== History of standard clothing sizes ==
Before the invention of standardized clothing sizes in the early 1800s, all clothing was made to fit individuals by either tailors or makers of clothing in their homes. Then garment makers noticed that the range of human body dimensions was relatively small (for their demographic). Because of the drape and ease of the fabric, not all measurements are required to obtain a well-fitting apparel in most styles. Sizes were based on:

- Horizontal torso measurements, which include the neck circumference, the shoulder width, the bustline measurements – over-bust circumference, the full bust circumference, the bust-point separation, and the under-bust (rib-cage) circumference – the natural waist circumference, the upper hip circumference and the lower hip circumference.
- Vertical torso measurements, which include the back (neck-waist) length, the shoulder-waist length (not the same as the back length, due to the slope of the shoulder), the bust-shoulder length, the bust-waist length, and the two hip-waist lengths.
- Sleeve measurements, which include the under-arm and over-arm lengths, the fore-arm length, the wrist circumference and the biceps circumference.

Pit-to-pit measurement is not a tailoring measurement, but a finished garment measure, used in the second-hand internet marketplace, generally the straight line measure across the garment, laid flat, at the bottom of the armpits.

== Standards ==
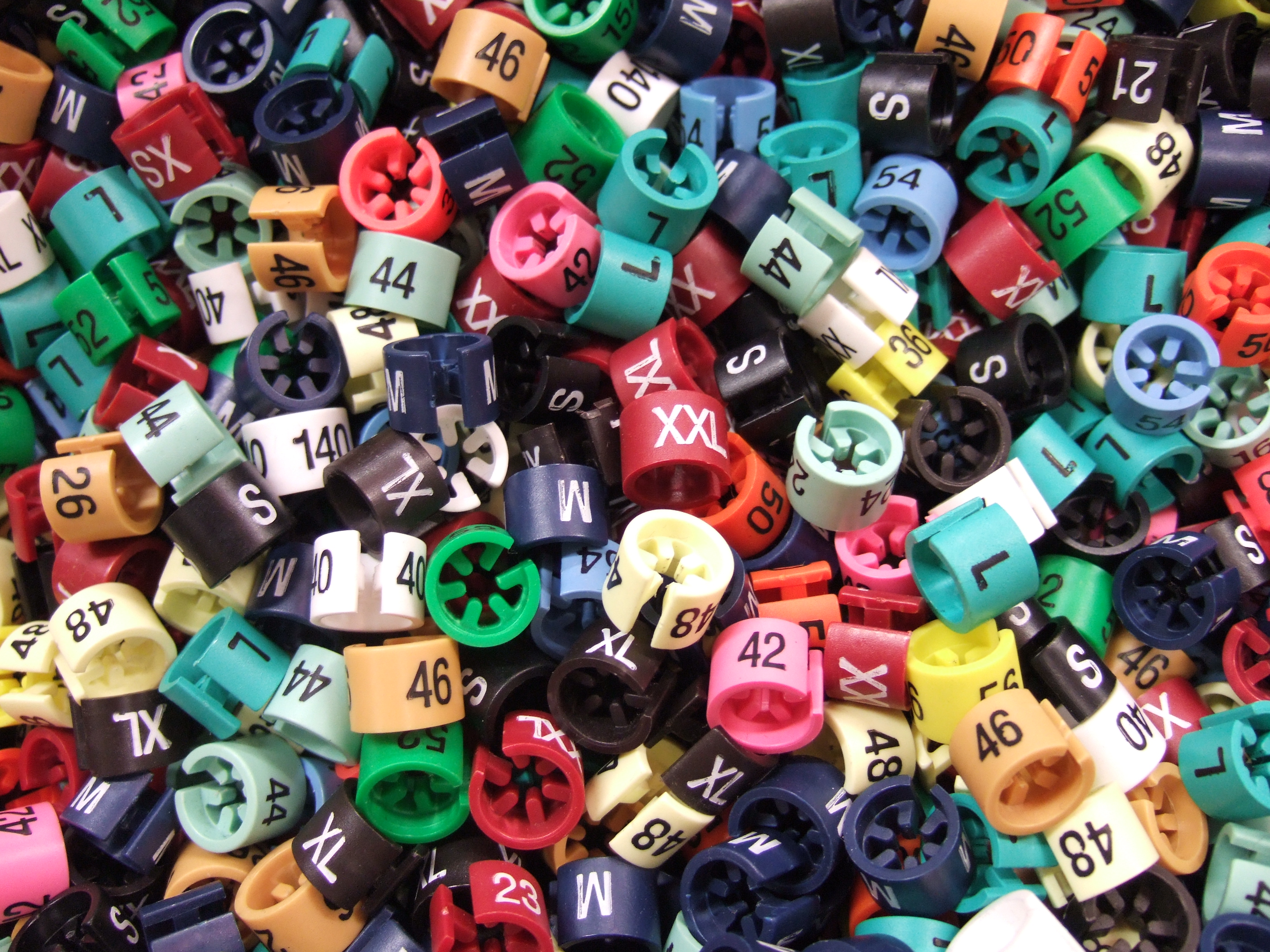
A variety of plastic size markers commonly attached to a clothes hanger in stores to indicate an item's size

=== International standards ===
There are several ISO standards for size designation of clothes, but most of them are being revised and replaced by one of the parts of ISO 8559 which closely resembles European Standard EN 13402:

- ISO 3635:1981, Size designation of clothes: Definitions and body measurement procedure (withdrawn, replaced by ISO 8559-1)
- ISO 3636:1977, Size designation of clothes: Men's and boys' outerwear garments (withdrawn, replaced by ISO 8559-2)
- ISO 3637:1977, Size designation of clothes: Women's and girls' outerwear garments (withdrawn, replaced by ISO 8559-2)
- ISO 3638:1977, Size designation of clothes: Infants garments (withdrawn, replaced by ISO 8559-2)
- ISO 4415:1981, Size designation of clothes: Men's and boys' underwear, nightwear and shirts (withdrawn, replaced by ISO 8559-2)
- ISO 4416:1981, Size designation of clothes: Women's and girls' underwear, nightwear, foundation garments and shirts (withdrawn, replaced by ISO 8559-2)
- ISO 4417:1977, Size designation of clothes: Headwear (withdrawn, replaced by ISO 8559-2)
- ISO 4418:1978, Size designation of clothes: Gloves (withdrawn, replaced by ISO 8559-2)
- ISO 5971:1981, 2017, Size designation of clothes: Pantyhose
- ISO 7070:1982, Size designation of clothes - Hosiery
- ISO 8559:1989, Garment construction and anthropometric surveys: Body dimensions (withdrawn, replaced by ISO 8559-1)
  - ISO 8559-1:2017, Size designation of clothes: Part 1: Anthropometric definitions for body measurement
  - ISO 8559-2:2017, Size designation of clothes: Part 2: Primary and secondary dimension indicators
  - ISO 8559-3:2018, Size designation of clothes: Part 3: Methodology of the creation of the body measurement tables and intervals
  - ISO 8559-3:2023, Size designation of clothes: Part 4: Determination of the coverage ratios of body measurement tables
- ISO/TR 10652:1991, Standard sizing systems for clothes (withdrawn)

=== Asian standards ===
==== Chinese standards ====
- GB 1335-81
- GB/T 1335.1-2008 Size designation of clothes - Men
- GB/T 1335.2-2008 Size designation of clothes - Women
- GB/T 1335.3-2008 Size designation of clothes - Children
- GB/T 2668-2002 Sizes for coats, jackets and trousers
- GB/T 14304-2002 Sizes for woolen garments

==== Japanese standards ====
- JIS L 4001 (1997) Sizing systems for infants' garments
- JIS L 4002 (1997) Sizing systems for boys' garments
- JIS L 4003 (1997) Sizing systems for girls' garments
- JIS L 4004 (1997) Sizing systems for men's garments
- JIS L 4005 (1997) Sizing systems for women's garments
- JIS L 4006 (1997) Sizing systems for foundation garments
- JIS L 4007 (1997) Sizing systems for Hosiery and Pantyhose

==== Korean standards ====
- KS K 0050 (2009) Men's wear
- KS K 0051 (2004) Women's wear
- KS K 0052 Infants
- KS K 0059 Headgear
- KS K 0070 Brassiere
- KS K 0037 Dress Shirts
- KS K 0088 Socks

==== Thai standards ====
- Wacoal (1981, 1987)

=== Australian standards ===
- L9 - Women's clothing - Apparel Manufacturers Association of NSW - 1959-1970
- AS1344-1972, 1975, 1997 Size coding scheme for women's clothing
- AS1182 - 1980 - Size coding scheme for infants and children's clothing

=== European standards ===
The European Standards Organisation (CEN) produced a series of standards, prefixed with EN 13402:

- EN 13402-1: Terms, definitions and body measurement procedure (2001, withdrawn and replace by ISO 8559-1:2020)
- EN 13402-2: Primary and secondary dimensions (2002, withdrawn and replaced by ISO 8559-2:2020)
- EN 13402-3: Size designation of clothes. Body measurements and intervals (2004, 2007, 2014, 2017)
- EN 13402-4: Coding system (2006)

These are intended to replace the existing national standards of the 33 member states. It is currently in common use for children's clothing, but not yet for adults. The third standard EN 13402-3 seeks to address the problem of irregular or vanity sizing through offering a SI unit based labelling system, which will also pictographically describe the dimensions a garment is designed to fit, per the ISO 3635 standard.

==== German standards ====
- DOB-Verband (1983)

==== French standards ====
- AFNOR NF G 03-001 (1977) - Human body - Vocabulary - Pictogram;
- AFNOR EXP G 03-002 (1977) - Women Measures
- AFNOR EXP G 03-003 (1977) - Men Measures
- AFNOR EXP G 03-006 (1978) - Measures of babies and young children
- AFNOR EXP G 03-007 (1977) - Size designation of clothes for men, women and children
- AFNOR NF G 03-008 (1984) - Tights - Sizes - Designation - Marking

==== Russian standards ====
- GOST R 53230-2008 (ISO 4415-1981) Size designation of clothes. Men's and boy's underwear, nightwear and shirts

==== British standards ====
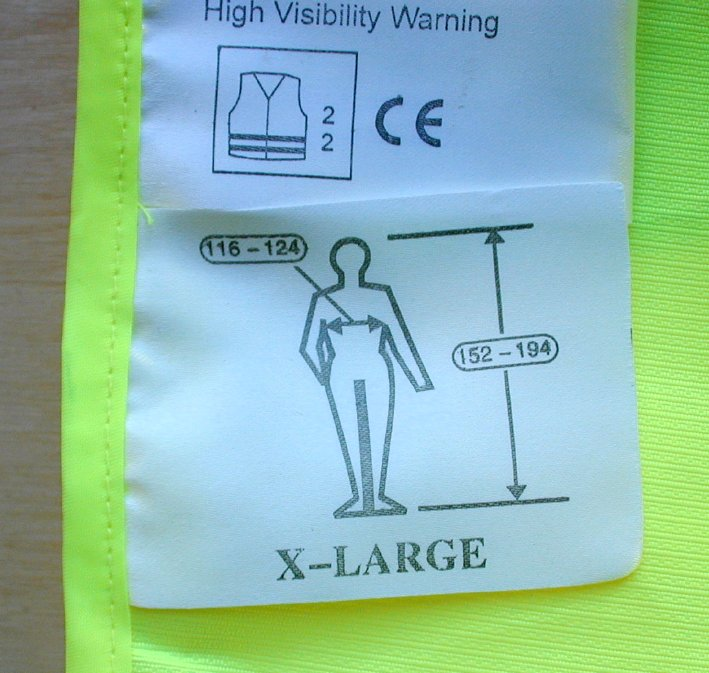
Clothes-size label with EN 13402-3 pictogram and body dimensions in centimetres (found on a high-visibility jacket sold in the United Kingdom)

- BS 3666:1982 Specification for size designation of women's wear
- BS 6185:1982 Specification for size designation of men's wear

BS 3666:1982, the standard for women's clothing, is rarely followed by manufacturers as it defines sizes in terms of hip and bust measurements only within a limited range. This has resulted in variations between manufacturers and a tendency towards vanity sizing.

==== Yugoslavian standards ====
Slovenia, Croatia, Bosnia and Herzegovina, North Macedonia and Serbia still use the JUS (F.G0.001 1979, F.G0.002 1979, F.G0.003 1979) standards developed in the former Yugoslavia. In addition to typical girth measurements clothing is also marked to identify which of 5 height bands: X-Short, Short, Medium, Tall, X-Tall, and body types: Slim, Normal, or Full, it is designed to fit.

=== American standards ===
==== US standards ====
- CS-151-50 - Infants, Babies, Toddlers and Children's clothing
- CS 215-58 - Women's Clothing (1958)
- PS 36-70 - Boys Clothing (1971)
- PS 42-70 – Women's Clothing (1971)
- PS 45-71 - Young Men's clothing
- PS 54-72 - Girls Clothing
- ASTM D5585-95 (2001)
- ASTM D6829-02 (2008)
- ASTM D5585-11 (2011) (withdrawn, 2020)
- ASTM D6240-98
- ASTM D6960-04 – Women's Plus sizes (2004)

There is no mandatory clothing size or labeling standard in the US, though a series of voluntary standards have been in place since the 1930s. The US government, however, did attempt to establish a system for women's clothing in 1958 when the National Bureau of Standards published Body Measurements for the Sizing of Women's Patterns and Apparel. The guidelines were made a commercial standard and were even updated in 1970. But the guide was eventually degraded to a voluntary standard until it was abolished altogether in 1983. Private organization ASTM International started to release its own recommended size carts in the 1990s.

Since then, the common US misses sizes have not had stable dimensions. Clothing brands and manufacturers size their products according to their preferences. For example, the dimensions of two size 10 dresses from different companies, or even from the same company, may have grossly different dimensions; and both are almost certainly larger than the size 10 dimensions described in the US standard. Vanity sizing may be partly responsible for this deviation (which began in earnest in the 1980s).

== Women ==
=== Comparison table ===
Comparison of women's dresses and suits sizes
Int	XXS	XS		S		M		L		XL		XXL	
US	0	2	4	6	8	10	12	14	16	18	20	22	24
UK	4	6	8	10	12	14	16	18	20	22	24	26	28
DE	30	32	34	36	38	40	42	44	46	48	50	52	54
FR	32	34	36	38	40	42	44	46	48	50	52	54	56
IT	36	38	40	42	44	46	48	50	52	54	56	58	60
KR	44	44	55	55	66	66	77	77	88	88			
JP			7	11	15	17	21						

=== Inch-based women's sizes (US/UK) ===
British (UK) and American (US) standard dress sizes, s, are calculated by bust circumference, b, measured in inches, as follows:

- US: s = b − 28
- UK: s = b − 24

Women's clothing US/UK
US	4	6	8	10	12
UK	8	10	12	14	16
Bust	32 in	34 in	36 in	38 in	40 in
Bust	81 cm	86 cm	91 cm	97 cm	102 cm
Waist	24 in	26.5 in	29 in	31 in	33 in
Waist	61 cm	67 cm	74 cm	79 cm	84 cm
Hip	35 in	37 in	39 in	41 in	43 in
Hip	89 cm	94 cm	99 cm	104 cm	109 cm

Women's junior misses dresses and coats
EU	28	30	32	34	36	38	40	42
US	1	3	5	7	9	11	13	15
UK	3	5	7	9	11	13	15	17

Women's blouses and sweaters
EU	40	42	44	46	48	50
US	32	34	36	38	40	42
UK	34	36	38	40	42	44

=== Women's jeans sizes: international conversions ===
International conversions (women's jeans)
Jeans Size	EU Size	INT	UK	FR	IT
23	30	XS	2	32	36
24	32	XS	4	34	38
25	32	XS	4	34	38
26	34	S	6	36	40
27	34	S	6	36	40
28	36	S	8	38	42
29	36	M	8	38	42
30	38	M	10	40	44
31	38	M	10	40	44
32	40	L	12	42	46
33	40	L	12	42	46
34	42	L	14	44	48
36	44	XL	14	46	50
38	46	XXL	16	48	52
40	48	XXL	18	50	54
42	50	3XL	20	52	56
44	52	4XL	22	54	58
46	54	4XL	24	56	60
48	56	5XL	26	58	62
50	58	6XL	28	60	64
52	60	6XL	30	62	66
54	62	7XL	32	64	68
56	64	8XL	34	66	70
58	66	8XL	36	68	72

=== Korean women's sizes ===
Korean casual and underwear (KS 051:2009)
Dress size	3XS	XXS	XS	S	M	L	XL	XXL	3XL	4XL
Bust (cm)	70	75	80	85	90	95	100	105	110–115	120–125

=== Japanese women's sizes ===
Japanese dresses sizes (JIS L 4005:2001)
Dress size	3	5	7	9	11	13	15	17	19	21	23	25	27	29	31
Bust (cm)	74	77	80	83	86	89	92	96	100	104	108	112	116	120	124

Japanese dresses length modifiers
Modifier	PP	P	R	T
Modifier	double-petite	petite	regular	tall
Body height (cm)	142	150	158	166
Additional hip girth (cm)	0	0	2	4

Japanese dresses fit modifiers
Modifier	Y	A	AB	B
Additional hip girth (cm)	0	4	8	12

Note: a Japanese dress marked 13-Y-PP or 13-Y-P would be designed for someone with an 89 cm bust and 89 cm hips, while a dress marked 13-B-T would be targeted at a taller individual with 105 cm hips, but the same 89 cm bust. The B fitting adds 12 cm and the T height modifier 4 cm to the base hip measurement 89 + 16 = 105 cm. Additionally there are a set of age based waist adjustments, such that a dress marketed at someone in their 60s may allow for a waist 9 cm larger than a dress, of the same size, marketed at someone in their 20s. The age based adjustments allow for up to a 3 cm increase in girth, per decade of life.

=== Continental European women's sizes ===
Italian (IT), French (FR) and German (DE) standard dress sizes, s, are calculated by bust circumference, b, and body height, h, both measured in centimetres, as follows:

- IT: s = b/2
- FR: s = b/2 − 4 = (b − 8)/2
- DE: s = b/2 − 6 = (b − 12)/2
  - short, petite, h < 164: s' = s/2 = b/4 − 3 = (b − 12)/4
  - tall, h > 170: s' = 2 × s = b − 12

French sizes are also used by Belgian manufacturers and retailers, while German sizes are also used by Austrian, Dutch and Scandinavian ones.

Women's clothing sizes (DE/AT/NL/SE/DK)
Short size codes	16	17	18	19	20	21	22	23	24	25	26	27
Standard size codes	32	34	36	38	40	42	44	46	48	50	52	54
Tall size codes	64	68	72	76	80	84	88	92	96	100	104	108
International	XS		S		M		L		XL		XXL	
EU tops	76	80	84	88	92	96	100	105	110	116	122	128
EU bottoms	60	64	68	72	76	80	84	88	94	100	106	112
Shoulder width (cm)	12				13				14			
Arm length (cm)	58	59		60		61				62		
Bust (cm)	74–77	78–81	82–85	86–89	90–93	94–97	98–102	103–107	108–113	114–119	120–125	126–131
Waist (cm)	58–61	62–64	65–68	69–72	73–77	78–81	82–85	86–90	91–95	96–102	103–108	109–114
Hips (cm)	80–84	85–89	90–94	95–97	98–101	102–104	105–108	109–112	113–116	117–122	123–128	129–134
Inside leg (cm)	103	104	105	106	107	108	109	110	111	112	113	114

== Men ==
=== Comparison tables ===
Men's shirts by neck girth
UK / EU / Japan	36	37	38	39	40	41	42	43	44	45	46
UK / US / AUS	14	14 1/2	15	15 1/2	15 3/4	16 1/4	16 1/2	17	17 1/2	18	18 1/2
Japan	S		M		L		LL				
Korea	90		95		100		105		110		
International	XS	S		M		L		XL		XXL	

Men's sports shirts, T-shirts by chest girth
EU	36	37/38	39/40	41/42	43/44	45/46
UK / US	XS	S	M	L	XL	XXL
chest girth	84 cm	92 cm	100 cm	108 cm	116 cm	124 cm

Men's sweaters, jackets
EU	38/40	42/44	46/48	50/52	52/54
UK / US	S	M	L	XL	XXL

Men's suits, suit jackets, blazers, overcoats
EU / Russia	40	42	44	46	48	50	52	54	56	58	60	62	64
UK / US	30	32	34	36	38	40	42	44	46	48	50	52	54
Japan	32	34	36	38	40	42	44	46	48	50	52		
Korea	80	85	90	95	100	105	110	115	120	125	130		
SML	XXS	XS	S	S	M	M	L	L	XL	XXL	XXXL		

Men's jeans, slacks, pants, trousers: Waist
EU	64/68	68/72	72/76	76/80	80/84	84/88	88/92	92/96	96/100	100/104	104/108	108/112	112/116
Italy	43	44	45	46	47	48	49	50	51	52	53	54	55
UK / US	27	28	29	30	31	32	33	34	36	38	40	42	44

Men's jeans, slacks, pants, trousers: Length
EU	34	36	38	40	42	44	46	48
UK / US	25/26	27/28	29/30	31	32	33	34	36

Men's underwear
EU	1	2	3	4	5
UK / US	S	M	L	XL	XXL

=== Continental European men's sizes ===
French (FR) and German (DE) standard suit sizes, s, are calculated by chest circumference, b, measured in centimetres, as follows:

- FR: s = b/2 + 0.5 = (b + 1)/2
- DE: s = b/2 − 0.5 = (b − 1)/2
  - short, stocky (kurz, untersetzt): s' = s/2 = b/4 − 0.25 = (b − 1)/4
  - portly (Bauchgröße): s' = s + 1 = b/2 + 0.5 = (b + 1)/2
  - tall, lean (lang, schlank): s' = 2 × (s − 1) = b − 3

French sizes are also used by Belgian manufacturers and retailers, while German sizes are also used by Austrian, Dutch and Scandinavian ones.

Men's clothing sizes (AT/DE/NL/DK/SE/FI)
Standard Size Codes	44	46	48	50	52	54	56	58	60	62	64	66	68	70	72	74
Underwear	4		5		6		7		8							
International	XXS	XS	S	M	L	XL	XXL	3XL		4XL		5XL		6XL		7XL
Chest (cm)	86–89	90–93	94–97	98–101	102–105	106–109	110–113	114–117	118–121	122–125	126-128	129-132	133-136	137-140	141-144	145-148
Waist size (cm)	74–77	78–81	82–85	86–89	90–94	95–99	100–104	105–109	110–114	115–119	120-124	125-128	129-132	133-134	135-138	139-142
Hip circumference (cm)	90–93	94–97	98–101	102–105	106–109	110–113	114–117	118–121	122–125	126–129						
Height (cm)	166–170	168–173	171–176	174–179	177–182	180–184	182–186	184–188	185–189	187–190	191-192	193-194	195-196	197-198	199-200	201-202
Short / Stocky (untersetzt)	22	23	24	25	26	27	28	29	30	31	32	33	34	35	36	37
Chest (cm)	89–92	93–96	97–100	101–104	105–108	109–112	113–116	117–120	121–124	125-128	129-132	133-136	137-140	141-144	145-148	
Waist size (cm)	81–84	85–88	89–92	93–96	97–100	101–106	107–110	111–114	115–118							
Hip circumference (cm)	97-100	101–104	105–108	109–112	113–116	117–120	121–124	125–128	129–132							
Height (cm)	163-167	166–170	169–173	172–176	175–178	177–180	179–182	181–183	182–183	184	185	186	187	188	189-190	191-192
Portly (Bauchgrößen)				51	53	55	57	59	61	63	65	67	69	71	73	
Chest (cm)				100–103	104–107	108–111	112–115	116–119	120–123	124–126	127-130	131-134	135-138	139-142	143-146	
Waist size (cm)				102–107	108–111	112–117	118–121	122–125	126–129	130-132	133-136	137-140	141-146	147-150	151-154	
Hip circumference (cm)				108–111	112–115	116–119	120–123	124–127	128–132	133–137						
Height (cm)				168–172	170–174	172–176	174–178	176–180	178–182	180–184						
Tall size (schlanke)		90	94	98	102	106	110	114	118	122						
Chest (cm)		88–91	92–95	96–99	100–103	104–107	108–111	111-114	115-118	119-122						
Waist size (cm)		74–77	78–81	82–85	86–89	90–93	94–98	100-104	105-109	110-114						
Hip circumference (cm)		92–95	96–99	100–103	104–107	108–111	112–115	116-119	120-123	124-127						
Height (cm)		175–179	178–182	181–185	184–188	186–190	188–192	193-197	196-200	199-203						

== Inclusive sizing ==
Inclusive sizing is the practice of having clothing ranges which do not make a distinction between "regular sizes" and "plus sizes".

== See also ==
- Anthropometry
- Bra size
- Bust/waist/hip measurements
- Female body shape
- Petite size
- Shoe size
- Size zero
