= Pro-ana =

Promotion of anorexia

Promotion of anorexia is the promotion of behaviors related to the eating disorder anorexia nervosa. It is often referred to simply as pro-ana or ana. The lesser-used term pro-mia refers likewise to bulimia nervosa and is sometimes used interchangeably with pro-ana. Pro-ana groups differ widely in their stances. Most claim that they exist mainly as a non-judgmental environment for anorexics; a place to turn to, to discuss their illness, and to support those who choose to enter recovery. Others deny anorexia nervosa is a mental illness and claim instead that it is a lifestyle choice that should be respected by doctors and family.

Pro-ana sites often feature thinspiration (or thinspo): images or video montages of slim people, often celebrities, who may range anywhere from being naturally slim to emaciated with visibly protruding bones. The scientific community recognises anorexia nervosa as a serious illness. Some research suggests anorexia nervosa has the highest rate of mortality of any psychological disorder.

== Culture ==
Medical professionals treating eating disorders have long noted that patients in recovery programs often "symptom pool", banding closely together for emotional support and validation. In this context, people with anorexia may collectively normalize their condition, defending it not as an illness but as an accomplishment of self-control and an essential part of their identity, with some members of these online communities going as far as claiming that starving oneself is a lifestyle choice rather than an illness. These 'lifestyle' claims may be a symptom of anosognosia. Other community members band together for support in managing their illnesses, such as sharing harm reduction tips and having others to talk to about their experiences that are going through the same thing. Many individuals in pro-ana communities use the phrase "pro for myself, not anyone else" to indicate that they are only interested in furthering their own disorders, not encouraging anyone else to imitate their behavior.

=== Online presence ===
Such advocacy has flourished on the Internet, mainly through tight-knit support groups centred on web forums and social network services such as Tumblr, Xanga, LiveJournal, X (formerly known as Twitter), Facebook and Myspace. These groups are typically small, vulnerable, partly hidden and characterized by frequent migrations. They also have a high female readership and are frequently the only means of support available to socially isolated anorexics.

Members of such support groups may:

- Endorse anorexia and/or bulimia as desirable (84% and 64% respectively in a 2010 survey).
- Share crash dieting techniques and recipes (67% of sites in a 2006 survey, rising to 83% in a 2010 survey).
- Coach each other on using socially acceptable pretexts for refusing food, such as veganism (which is notably more prevalent in the eating-disordered in general).
- Compete with each other at losing weight, or fast together in displays of solidarity.
- Commiserate with one another after breaking fast or binging.
- Advise on how to best induce vomiting, and on using laxatives and emetics.
- Give tips on hiding weight loss from parents and doctors.
- Share information on reducing the side-effects of anorexia.
- Post their weight, body measurements, details of their dietary regimen or pictures of themselves to solicit acceptance and affirmation.
- Suggest ways to ignore or suppress hunger pangs.

Many have popular blogs and forums on which members seek companionship by posting about their daily lives or boasting about personal accomplishments of weight loss. The communities centred on such sites can be warmly welcoming (especially in recovery-friendly groups) or sometimes cliquish and openly suspicious of newcomers. In particular, hostility is often leveled at:

- The non-eating disordered who express disapproval, including the spouses, relatives and friends of members who appear on-site to post threats and warnings.
- Casual dieters who join, believing that inducing eating disorders will cause them to lose weight more effectively. Such people are often derisively referred to as "wannabes" or "wannarexics".

==== Thinspiration ====
Pro-ana sites often (84%, in a 2010 survey) feature thinspiration (or thinspo): images or video montages of slim people, often celebrities, who may range anywhere from being naturally slim to emaciated with visibly protruding bones. Pro-ana bloggers, forum members and social networking groups likewise post thinspiration to motivate one another toward further weight loss. Conversely, reverse thinspiration [also commonly referred to as fatspo] features images of fatty food or overweight people intended to induce disgust. There exists significant controversy between supporters and opponents of thinspiration; some assert that thinspiration only "glorifies" eating disorders while some thinspiration bloggers argue that the purpose of thinspiration is to support a healthy level of weight loss.

Thinspirational clips circulate widely on video sharing sites, pro-ana blogs often post thinspirational entries, and many pro-ana forums have threads dedicated to sharing thinspiration. Thinspiration can also take the form of inspirational mantras, quotes or selections of lyrics from poetry or popular music (94% of sites in a 2003 survey).

Thinspiration often has a spiritual-ascetic flavour, referring to fasting through metaphors of bodily purity, food through allusions to sin and corruption, and thinness through imagery of angels and angelic flight. Exhortations like "Ana's Creed" and "The Thin Commandments" are also common.

=== Appeal ===
Social researchers studying pro-ana have varied explanations for its popularity, with some characterizing it as a rejection of modern consumerism and others suggesting that pro-ana functions as a coping mechanism for those already emotionally stressed by eating disorders. However, most agree on two elements of pro-ana sites:

- Initially, pro-ana sites attract both the non-eating disordered (who first visit seeking tips and techniques for losing weight) and the eating-disordered (who seek advice on hiding their disordered behaviors or minimizing the physical damage caused by over-exercising and severe calorie restriction).
- Pro-ana sites give their members a strong sense of community and common identity.

=== Fashion ===
Red bracelets are popularly worn in pro-ana, both as a discreet way for anorexics to socially identify and as a tangible reminder to avoid eating. Pro-mia bracelets, likewise, are blue or purple. Most such bracelets are simple beaded items traded briskly on online auction sites.

== Impact ==
=== Proliferation ===
Pro-ana has proliferated rapidly on the Internet, with some observers noting a first wave of pro-ana sites on free web hosting services in the late 1990s, and a second wave attributed to the recent rise of blogging and social networking services.

A survey by Internet security firm Optenet found a 470% increase in pro-ana and pro-mia sites from 2006 to 2007. A similar increase was also noted in a 2006 Maastricht University study investigating alternatives to censorship of pro-ana material. In the study, the Dutch blog host punt.nl began in October 2006 presenting visitors to pro-ana blogs on its service with a click-through warning containing a disparaging message and links to pro-recovery sites. Although the warnings were a deterrence (33.6% of the 530,000 unique visitors logged did not proceed past the warning), the number of such blogs actually increased tenfold, with their monthly traffic figures doubling on average by the end of the study.

=== Viewership ===
In a 2009 survey by the Katholieke Universiteit Leuven of 711 Flemish high school students aged 13–17, 12.6% of girls and 5.9% of boys reported having visited pro-ana websites at least once. In another 2009 survey, by parental control software vendor CyberSentinel of 1500 female Internet users aged 6–15, one in three reported having searched online for dieting tips, while one in five reported having corresponded with others on social networking sites or in chat rooms for tips on dieting.

Visitors to pro-ana web sites also include a significant number of those already diagnosed with eating disorders: a 2006 survey of eating disorder patients at Stanford Medical School found that 35.5% had visited pro-ana web sites; of those, 96.0% learned new weight loss or purging methods from such sites (while 46.4% of viewers of pro-recovery sites learned new techniques).

=== Effect ===
Pro-ana sites can negatively impact the eating behavior of people with and without eating disorders. One study of individuals without eating disorders demonstrated that 84% of participants decreased caloric intake by an average of 2,470 calories (301 min -7851 max) per week after viewing pro-ED (eating disorder) websites. Only 56% of participants actually perceived the reduction in their intake. Three weeks after the experiment, 24% of participants reported continuing weight control strategies from pro-ana websites, though they did not continue to visit those sites. Controls viewing health and travel websites did not decrease caloric intake at a significant level. Other studies have found that women with varying levels of eating disorder symptomatology were more likely to engage in image comparison and exercise after viewing pro-ana websites versus control websites.

Pro-ana sites can negatively impact cognition and affect. Women who viewed a pro-ana site, but not control sites focused on fashion or home décor, experienced an increase in negative affect and decreases in self-esteem, appearance self-efficacy, and perceived attractiveness. They also reported feeling heavier and being more likely to think about their weight. The effects of perfectionism, BMI, internalization of the thin ideal, and pre-existing ED symptomatology as moderators of negative affect were comparable to chance, suggesting that pro-ana websites can affect a broad spectrum of individuals, not simply those with ED characteristics.

A 2007 survey by the University of South Florida of 1575 girls and young women found that those who had a history of viewing pro-ana websites did not differ from those who viewed only pro-recovery websites on any of the survey's measures, including body mass index, negative body image, appearance dissatisfaction, level of disturbance, and dietary restriction. Those who had viewed pro-ana websites were, however, moderately more likely to have a negative body image than those who did not.

Similarly, girls in the 2009 Leuven survey who viewed pro-ana websites were more likely to have a negative body image and be dissatisfied with their body shape.

A 2012 report by Deloitte Access Economics, commissioned by Australian non-profit The Butterfly Foundation, estimated that eating disorders resulted in productivity losses totaling just over $AUD15 billion, with 1828 (515 males and 1313 females) dying that year from eating disorder-related complications.

=== Social support vs. exacerbation of illness ===
Unlike pro-ana sites, pro-recovery sites are designed to encourage development and maintenance of healthy behaviors and cognitions. A study of pro-ana and pro-recovery website use among adolescents with eating disorders found that adolescents used both types of websites to further eating disordered behaviors. Those who viewed pro-ana sites were comparable to those who viewed pro-recovery sites with respect to appearance dissatisfaction, restriction, and bulimic behaviors. Over half of parents were unaware of any ED website usage.

People who use pro-ana sites report lower social support than controls and seek to fill this deficit by use of pro-ana sites. While pro-ana site users in this study perceived greater support from online communities than offline relationships, they also reported being encouraged to continue eating disorder behaviors. Users of pro-ana sites (n=60) cited a sense of belonging (77%), social support (75%), and support for the choice to continue current eating disorder behaviors (54%) as reasons for joining a pro-ana site. Reasons for continuing to use a pro-ana site included general support for stress (84%), meeting others with eating disorders (50%), and finding triggers for eating disorder behaviors (37%). Finally, behaviors first learned after visiting a pro-ana site include using thinspiration (63%), hiding eating disorder behaviors (60%), fasting (57%), using diuretics and laxatives (45%), vomiting (23%), using alcohol or other drugs to inhibit appetite (22%), and self-harm (22%).

Some studies, however, claim that the link between pro-ana websites and increased incidence of eating disorders are not strongly linked; instead, these communities have just increased the visibility of those affected. It's possible that health professionals and academics are eager to place blame on these communities because of this increased visibility and being an "easy target" for understanding the complex problem of root causes of eating disorders.

== Controversy and criticism ==
Many medical professionals and some anorexics view pro-ana as a glamorization of a serious illness. Pro-ana began to attract attention from the mainstream press when The Oprah Winfrey Show aired a special episode in October 2001 focusing on pro-ana. Pressure from the public and pro-recovery organizations led to Yahoo and GeoCities shutting down pro-ana sites. In response, many groups now take steps to conceal themselves, disclaim their intentions as neutral and recovery-supportive (58% of sites in a 2006 survey), or interview members to screen out the non-eating disordered.

=== Medical profession ===
Health care professionals and medical associations have generally negative views of pro-ana groups and the information they disseminate.

The National Association of Anorexia Nervosa and Associated Disorders (ANAD) states that Pro-Ana sites "can pose a serious threat to some individuals, not simply because they promote eating disorder behaviors, but because they build a sense of community that is unhealthy. They lure the impressionable and persuade them that the Pro-Ana community is providing caring and nurturing advice."

The Academy for Eating Disorders (AED) stated that "websites that glorify anorexia as a lifestyle choice play directly to the psychology of its victims", expressing concern that sites dedicated to the promotion of anorexia as a desirable "lifestyle choice" "provide support and encouragement to engage in health threatening behaviors, and neglect the serious consequences of starvation." However, one of its board members, Eric van Furth, has noted that pro-ana sites have relatively few visitors and advises against legal sanction of such sites, claiming instead that popular media play the more important role in establishing ideals of female thinness.

Bodywhys (the Eating Disorders Association of Ireland) notes that pro-ana sites "might initially help people to feel less isolated, but the community that they create is an unhealthy community that encourages obsessiveness and minimization of the seriousness of these potentially deadly disorders."

Beat (the Eating Disorders Association of the UK) has remarked that those who seek out pro-ana sites do so "to find support, understanding and acceptance. We don't call for the sites to be banned, but rather for everyone else to consider how they can also provide that understanding and acceptance so that these sites don't become the only refuge for someone."

The UK Royal College of Psychiatrists has called for the Council of Child Internet Safety—a UK government advisory body—to expand its definition of harmful online content to include pro-ana sites, and to inform parents and teachers of the dangers of pro-ana, arguing that "the broader societal context in which pro-ana and pro-mia sites thrive is one where young women are constantly bombarded with toxic images of supposed female perfection that are impossible to achieve, make women feel bad about themselves and significantly increase their risk of eating disorders."

The National Eating Disorders Association (NEDA) "actively speaks out against pro-anorexia and pro-bulimia websites. These sites provide no useful information on treatment but instead encourage and falsely support those who, sadly, are ill but do not seek help." NEDA has also warned that journalists often glamorize anorexia by associating anorexia with personal self-control and that media coverage of pro-ana often triggers the already-anorexic by mentioning weights and calorie counts and by showing photographs of thin people.

=== Media ===
In October 2001, The Oprah Winfrey Show hosted a special on anorexia; the pro-ana movement was discussed briefly by the guest panel, who expressed alarm at the appearance of pro-ana websites and recommended the use of filtering software to bar access to them.

In July 2002, the Baltimore City Paper published an investigative report into pro-ana on the web.

"Growing up Online", a January 2008 episode of the PBS Frontline television program, also featured a brief discussion of pro-ana.

The 2009 novel Wintergirls features a protagonist with anorexia, who at one point in the novel seeks support from a pro-ana forum, referring to the people there as "her sisters" and "the only people that understand".

In April 2009, The Truth about Online Anorexia, an investigative documentary about pro-ana on the Internet, aired on ITV1 in the UK presented by BBC Radio 1 DJ Fearne Cotton.

In April 2012 speech at Harvard University, Vogue Italia editor Franca Sozzani conceded that the fashion industry may be a cause of the recent rise in eating disorders, but that the industry was being unfairly singled out for blame: "How can all this be possibly caused by fashion? And how come that Twiggy, who would be surely considered an anorexic today, did not arise controversy in the Sixties and did not produce a string of anorexia followers?" According to Sozzani, pro-ana sites were more effective at promoting eating disorders, and obesity was the more pressing public health problem that food industry was not being likewise attacked for exacerbating.

The existence of pro-ana blogs and forums was featured in the 2014 Lifetime film Starving in Suburbia, which starred Polish actress Izabella Miko as "ButterflyAna", a beautiful model and moderator on the internet who promotes anorexia religiously to the followers of her blog. This entices teenager Hannah (Laura Wiggins) to become severely anorexic; this was also the first Lifetime film to address the subject matter of anorexia among men and boys, when Hannah's brother, Leo, is revealed to suffer from anorexia and later dies due to health complications from the disorder.

=== Arts ===
An image from Ivonne Thein's Thirty-two kilos, a collection of digitally altered photographs satirizing thinspiration

Thirty-two kilos, an exhibition by photographer Ivonne Thein, went on display at the Berlin Postfuhramt art exhibition center in May 2008 and the Washington Goethe-Institut in January 2009, featuring photographs of young women digitally manipulated to appear skeletally thin. Thein said that the photographs were intended as a mocking and satirical take on pro-ana. However, many images from the exhibition were nevertheless later shared online as thinspiration.

=== Social networking services ===
In July 2001, Yahoo—after receiving a letter of complaint from ANAD—began removing pro-ana sites from its Yahoo Clubs (now Yahoo Groups) service, stating that such sites endorsing self-harm were violations of its terms of service agreement.

LiveJournal has not made a position statement on pro-ana. In August 2007, however, a staff member declined to act on an abuse report filed against a pro-ana community hosted on its network, stating that:

Suspending pro-anorexia communities will not make anyone suffering from the disorder become healthy again. Allowing them to exist, however, has several benefits. It reassures those who join them that they are not alone in the way they feel about their bodies. It increases the chance that the friends and loved ones of the individuals in the community will discover their disorders and assist them in seeking professional help.

Facebook staff seek out and regularly delete pro-ana related groups. A spokesperson for the online service has stated that such pages violate the site's terms of service agreement by promoting self-harm in others.

MySpace does not ban pro-ana material and has stated that

"it's often very tricky to distinguish between support groups for users who are suffering from eating disorders and groups that might be termed as 'pro' anorexia or bulimia. Rather than censor these groups, we are working to create partnerships with organisations like b-eat."

MySpace has chosen instead to cycle banner advertisements for pro-recovery organizations through pro-ana members' profiles.

In November 2007, Microsoft shut down four pro-ana sites on the Spanish-language version of its Spaces social networking service at the behest of IQUA, the Internet regulatory body for Catalonia. A Microsoft spokesperson stated that such sites "infringe all the rules on content created by users and visible on our sites".

In September 2008, San Sebastián-based Spanish-language web portal Hispavista removed its pro-ana forums at the request of the provincial prosecutor for Guipúzcoa and the Children's Ombudsman of Madrid, who stated that "while not illegal, the harmful and false information in such forums being disseminated to minors will impair their proper development."

In February 2012, after consulting with NEDA, the blog-hosting service Tumblr announced that it would shut down blogs hosted on its microblogging service which "actively promote or glorify self harm," including eating disorders, and display warnings with names of organizations that can help facilitate recovery in people affected by eating disorders, on searches for common pro-eating disorder terms. Despite this, Tumblr remains a large hub for pro-ana microblogging. Pinterest, a social photo-sharing site, similarly amended its terms of service in March 2012 to ban pro-ana content, but was similarly unsuccessful. Instagram followed suit and announced in April 2012 that it would summarily disable any accounts on its photo-sharing service with pro-ana specific hashtags on images.

TikTok's algorithm has been criticized for amplifying pro-ana content.

=== Politics ===
In the United Kingdom, 40 MPs signed an early day motion tabled in February 2008 by the then Liberal Democrats member for Cheadle, Mark Hunter, urging government action against pro-ana sites. The motion was timed to coincide with the UK National Eating Disorder Awareness Week.

In the United Kingdom, Jo Swinson, the Liberal Democrat member for East Dunbartonshire, called for advertisers to voluntarily adopt similar disclaimers in an adjournment debate in October 2009, and later in an early day motion tabled in February 2010. She has stated that such "photos can lead people to believe in realities that, very often, do not exist," and that "when teenagers and women look at these pictures in magazines, they end up feeling unhappy with themselves."

In April 2008, a bill outlawing material which "provokes a person to seek excessive thinness by encouraging prolonged restriction of nourishment" was tabled in the French National Assembly by UMP MP Valérie Boyer. It imposes a fine of €30,000 and two years imprisonment (rising to €45,000 and three years if there was a resulting death) on offenders. Health minister Roselyne Bachelot, arguing for the bill, stated that "giving young girls advice about how to lie to their doctors, telling them what kinds of food are easiest to vomit, encouraging them to torture themselves whenever they take any kind of food is not part of liberty of expression." The bill passed the National Assembly, but stalled in the Senate, where a June 2008 report by the Committee of Social Affairs emphatically recommended against such legislation and instead suggested early-screening programs by schools and physicians.

Boyer subsequently introduced another bill in September 2009 to mandate disclaimers on photographs in which body parts have been retouched, with the aim of reducing the impact of unrealism in photography on young girls and women. The bill was ostensibly targeted at advertising photography but could be broadly applicable to digitally manipulated photography in general, including thinspirational montages. It imposes a penalty of €37,500 per violation, with a possible rise to 50% of the cost of each advertisement. The bill did not pass its first reading and was relegated to the Committee of Social Affairs.

In April 2009, Dutch Minister for Youth and Family André Rouvoet called for click-through warnings to be added to all pro-ana sites on Dutch hosting services, citing a successful trial of such warnings by blog host punt.nl in 2006. The Dutch Hosting Provider Association, however, has stated that "the Internet is simply a reflection of a world with many undesirable things", and that its members cannot be held responsible for monitoring and disclaiming all hosted content.

In March 2012, the Israeli Knesset passed a bill sponsored by Kadima MK Rachel Adato and Likud MK Danny Danon requiring advertisements which have been retouched to alter the body shape of models to fully disclose the fact. The bill, which applies to both foreign-produced and locally produced advertising, also sets a lower BMI limit for models featured in advertisements of 18.5 (the threshold of underweight under World Health Organization guidelines).

=== Popular culture ===
In a November 2009 interview with Women's Wear Daily, model Kate Moss gave a popular thinspirational slogan as her motto: "Nothing tastes as good as skinny feels." Moss came under widespread criticism—particularly by eating disorder recovery organizations—for endorsing pro-ana. Her agency, Storm, stated: "This was part of a longer answer Kate gave during a wider ranging interview which has unfortunately been taken out of context and misrepresented." Still, Moss has been known in the fashion world to have helped popularize the "heroin chic" trend, which uses models with disheveled, ultra-skinny, and waif-like body types on the runway.

== See also ==
- Fat acceptance movement
- Inedia
