= The Association for Women with Large Feet =

British organization

The Association for Women with Large Feet was a British organization founded by Airton resident Mrs. Phyllis Crone in 1949. It lobbied for clothing manufacturers to better provide for tall women. Members had to be at least 5 feet 8 inches tall.

The Association was originally formed to convince footwear manufacturers to provide more attractive options for women with larger shoe sizes. However, it expanded to lobby clothing manufacturers more generally to provide for tall women, with some success. The Association made direct approaches to manufacturers, and if they agreed to provide for tall women, their details were circulated to all members.

The group changed its name to The Association of Tall Women in October 1951 to increase its appeal and membership. There were reportedly 10 branches across the UK by this point, with members joining at a rate of around 50 per week. Membership fees were 3 shillings and 6 pence (3s 6d) per year. By 1952 the group was reported to have 2,000 members in London alone.

As part of their campaign, in 1952 the Association held a public display of clothing for taller women at a London department store. Successes included convincing stocking manufacturers to produce nylons with longer foot and leg measurements, "ending a nightmare for taller women", and the establishment of a London shop called "Tall Girls".
