= Katie Green =

English model

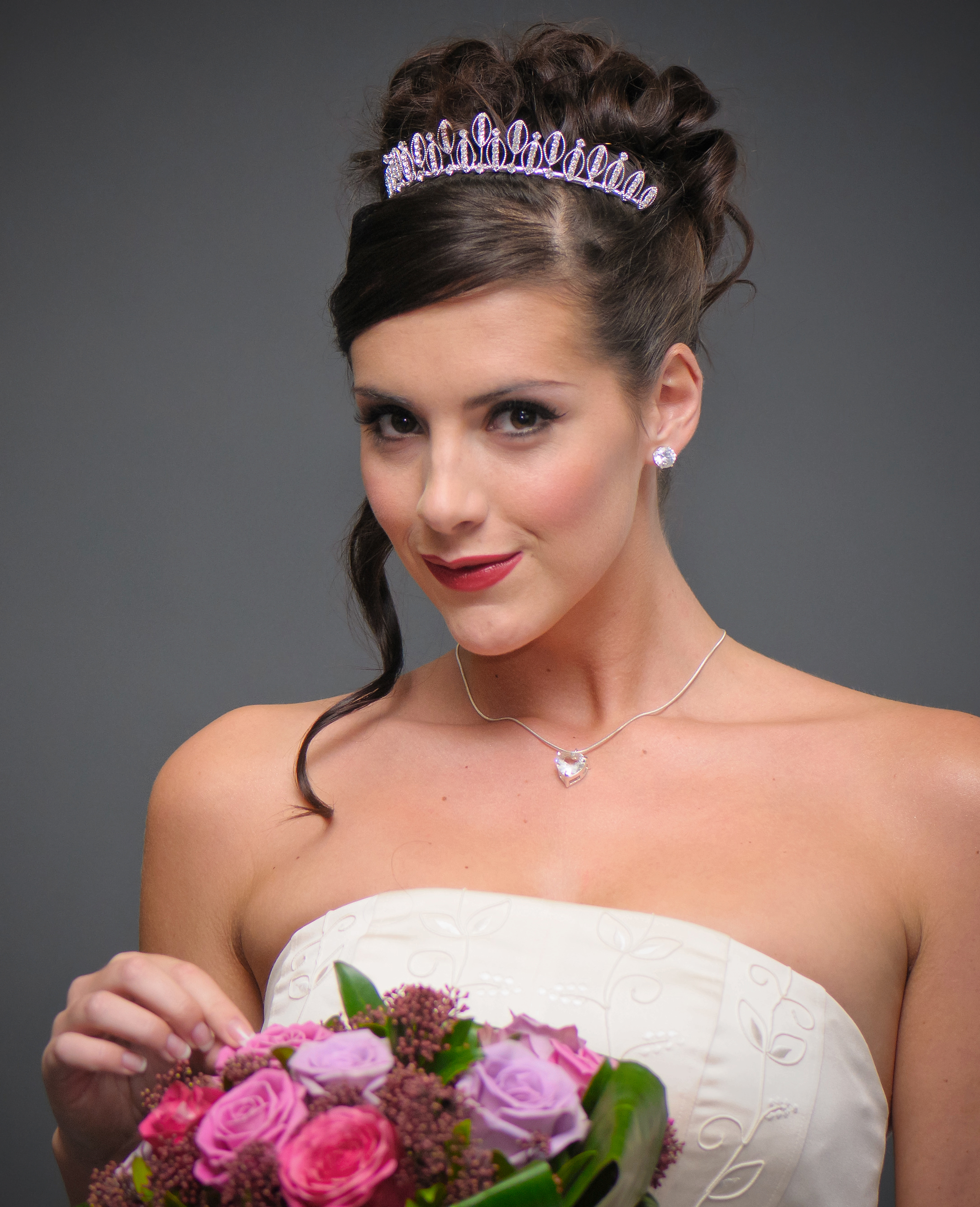
- Green in 2008
- Born: Katie Green; 28 August 1987 (age 39); England
- Occupation: Model
- Spouse: Nathan Marsh
- Modelling information
- Height: 5 ft 10 in (1.78 m)
- Hair colour: Dark brown
- Eye colour: Brown

Katie Green (born 28 August 1987) is an English model from Chichester, West Sussex. She was first given an opportunity to model when a Surrey photographer arranged a test-shoot for her at Image Park Studio in West Sussex. Green was originally signed to represent Wonderbra in July 2008, but her agency required her to lose weight, and she refused, ending her contract. Green is unusual among models because of her weight for someone her size and her refusal to lose weight to conform to the norms agencies expect of models. She initiated a campaign against size zero models with the Liberal Democrat MP Lembit Öpik. Green continues to model and has appeared in numerous publications and campaigns. In 2011 she posed topless as a Kate Middleton look alike in Zoo Magazine.

== Personal life ==
Green is 5 ft 10 in (1.78 m) tall.

== Modelling contracts ==
Green was first given an opportunity to model when a Surrey, England photographer arranged a test-shoot for her at a photographic studio in West Sussex. She subsequently modelled for a group of photographers on a regular basis to gain experience. She was then introduced to a top London photographer for whom she began to regularly model.

Green was a shop assistant in West Sussex earning minimum wage in summer 2008 and considering applying to join the police force when she saw a magazine advertisement for a model to represent Wonderbra. She thought she did not have a chance but attended an open casting in London in July 2008 and had a few quick pictures taken in her underwear. She applied for FHM's "High Street Honeys" competition in 2007, reaching the top 10 in 2008. A week later, The Daily Express newspaper ran a picture of her on page three, asking readers to contact them if they knew who she was as she had been selected as the new face of Wonderbra. Green contacted the newspaper and soon learned that she had beaten 4,000 other girls in the competition.

Wonderbra introduced her to Premier Model Management agency, with whom she signed. She reported that "one of the guys from the PR agency from Wonderbra insisted that I lose weight, that it was normal for models to be a size 8.... Unless I could drop down to that weight, they wouldn't be willing to get me more work." The agency arranged for two photo shoots with Wonderbra, and she appeared on billboards in the West End of London and on the packaging for Wonderbra's D to G cup bras, with the message, "D to G, because we’re more than a handful".

The agency insisted that she needed to lose 2 stone (28 lb; 13 kg) and reduce her dress size from a UK size 12 to a UK size 8-10. She lost 7 pounds (3.2 kg) in eight days and became ill. She expected modelling work to start flooding in, but she said that every time the agency called "it wasn’t with an offer of work, it was to check on my weight loss. I was invited back to London by Premier. I thought, 'Great, this must be for a new photoshoot,' but they just wanted to measure me to see how much weight I’d lost. I had to stand on scales then a tape measure came out to do all my vital statistics." Her family contacted the agency about the demand that she lose weight, and was told, "We advised Katie that commercial and lingerie models need to be an average size 10 as is requested by the market sector she wanted to model for." She described the pressure to lose weight in an interview in a national newspaper and announced her decision to leave modeling.

Green was signed by the Unleashed PR agency and became the new face of Ultimo's D-G range, alongside fellow model Melinda Messenger and the Spice Girl Mel B.

== Campaign against size zero models ==
In July 2009, Green launched a campaign titled "Say No to Size Zero" against "size zero" models, with the Liberal Democrat Member of Parliament Lembit Öpik. They began a petition drive with the goal to end size zero and underweight models on the catwalk or working in the fashion industry. They set a goal to obtain 20,000 signatures and to present the petition to the prime minister and Parliament. They campaigned for legislation that would require regular health checks for all models before undertaking any assignments. Tabloid newspapers reported Green and Öpik were dating, suggestions they both denied.

== Ultimo ends contract ==
In September 2009, Green was photographed topless on a beach. On 26 September 2009, Ultimo stopped representing Green when she broke the company's "no nudity" clause in her contract by being photographed topless at various beaches.

== Other work ==
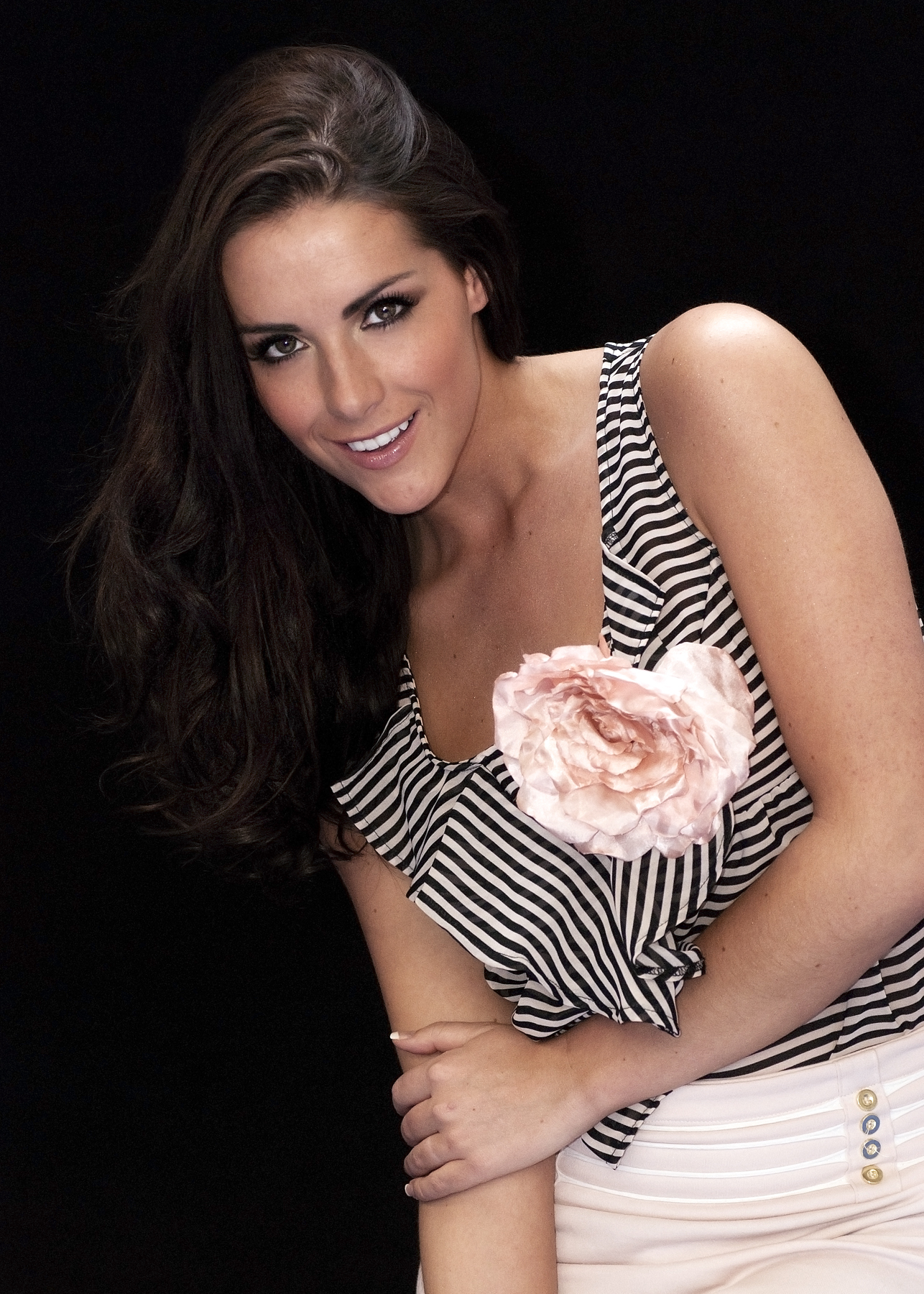
Green in 2010.

On 11 September 2009, Green raised £200,000 for various charities at the BGC Partners charity event in honour of employees who died during the September 11 attacks. Green joined Jonathan Ross, Sir Alex Ferguson and Carol Vorderman at the event amongst others.

Green had a small cameo in the feature film Get Him to the Greek. On 29 September, Green came third in a national poll conducted by The Daily Star to find the perfect celebrity body, beating Cheryl Cole, Mel B and Victoria Beckham.

Green has appeared in numerous publications, such as FHM, OK! and The Sun. She was also voted one of the top 12 most inspirational women of 2008 by Company magazine.

She was asked to serve as a judge for Love It magazine’s modelling competition for size girls, "The Love It Lovelies".

Green launched "National Measure Your Bust Week" at Debenhams on Oxford Street in London during Spring 2009 with the Ultimo creator Michelle Mone.

== See also ==
- Lad culture
- Lad mags
