= U.S. standard clothing size =

U.S. standard clothing sizes for women were originally developed from statistical data in the 1940s and 1950s. At that time, they were similar in concept to the EN 13402 European clothing size standard, although individual manufacturers have always deviated from them, sometimes significantly.

However, as a result of various cultural pressures, most notably vanity sizing, North American clothing sizes have drifted substantially away from this standard over time, and now have very little connection to it. Instead, they now follow the more loosely defined standards known as U.S. catalog sizes.

Body measurements below are given in inches.

== History ==
Men's standard sizes were probably developed first during the American Revolutionary War, and they were in regular use by the American army during the War of 1812 for ready-made uniforms. These were based on the chest measurement, with other measurements being assumed to be either proportional (the circumference of the neck, waist, hips, and thighs) or easily altered (length of the inseam).

As this was largely successful in men, the same approach was attempted in the early 20th century for women using the bust as the sole measurement. However, this proved unsuccessful because women's bodies have far more variety in shape. The hourglass figure is frequently used as an industry standard, but only 8% of women have this body shape. A woman with an hourglass figure and a woman with an apple-shaped figure who have the same bust size will not have the same waist or hip sizes.

This was a significant problem for mail-order companies, and several attempts at predictable, standard sizing were made. In the 1940s, the statisticians Ruth O'Brien and William Shelton received a Works Progress Administration grant to conduct the most ambitious effort to solve this problem. Their team measured almost 15,000 women across the US. After discovering the complex diversity of women's actual sizes, which produced five to seven body shapes, they proposed a three-part sizing system. Each size would be the combination of a single number representing an upper body measurement, plus an indicator for height (short, regular, and long) and an indication for girth (slim, regular, and stout). The various combinations of height and girth resulted in nine sizes for each numerical upper-body measurement, which was highly impractical for manufacturing.

As a result, O'Brien and Shelton's work was rejected. In 1958, the National Bureau of Standards invented a new sizing system, based on the hourglass figure and using only the bust size to create an arbitrary standard of sizes ranging from 8 to 38, with an indication for height (short, regular, and tall) and lower-body girth (plus or minus). The resulting commercial standard was not widely popular, and was declared voluntary in 1970 and withdrawn entirely in 1983. In 1995, ASTM International published its own voluntary standard, which has been revised since then. It has not been widely adopted.

== Women's sizes ==
Women's sizes are divided into various types, depending on height. These charts give an indication of size only and are by no means exact as they vary from manufacturer to manufacturer, sometimes by a full inch up and down.

=== Overview ===
There are multiple size types, designed to fit somewhat different body shapes. Variations include the height of the person's torso (known as back length), whether the bust, waist, and hips are straighter (characteristic of teenagers) or curvier (like many adult women), and whether the bust is higher or lower (characteristic of younger and older women, respectively). These categories include:

Misses sizes
The most common size category. For women of about average height (5 ft 4 in) with an average bust height and an hourglass figure. Dress sizes may be given as girth at the bust in inches (e.g., 36), but even-numbered sizes from 2 to 16 are more common. Categorical sizes range from XS (extra-small) to XL (extra-large).
Junior sizes
For short women with higher busts and fairly straight bodies. Junior sizes are commonly given as odd-numbered sizes from 1 to 15, which correspond to the next number up in misses' sizes.
Women's sizes or plus sizes
For larger women of average height, sometimes with lower bust lines. Like misses' sizes, the sizes may be given as a dress size based on the bust measurement, but they are usually given as even-numbered sizes from 18 up. Categorical sizes usually range from 1X (similar to extra-large, but with slightly different proportions compared to the misses' size) up.
Misses petite
Made for short women (Usually under 5 ft 4 in) with average busts and the same shaping characteristics as Regular Misses. Sizes follow the misses' standard and are marked with a P, as in 10P.
Junior petite
For very short women with average busts and fairly straight bodies. Size may be denoted as "5JP" or as "5P".
Women's petite
For larger, shorter women, sometimes with lower bust lines. Sizes are marked the same as women's with a P, as in 20P.
Young junior
For short women with high busts and fairly straight bodies.
Tall sizes
For taller women (usually 5 ft 8 in or above), usually with a proportionately average bust height and an hourglass figure. Sizes are usually written with the corresponding misses' size and a T to indicate tall, as in "10T".
Half sizes
For short women with lower busts and more hourglass body shapes. Sizes are written with a 1/2, as in "10 1/2".

=== Details ===
Please compare to your favorite fit charts. These measurements conflict with many other size charts. These charts are significantly smaller than many current US clothing companies.

Pattern sizes - DuBarry / Woolworth (1931–1955)
5 ft 3 in–5 ft 6 in tall, average: bust (3 in < hips), waist (9 in < hips)
Dimension/size	10	11	12	13	14	15	16	18	20	22
Bust	28	29	30	31	32	33	34	36	38	40
Waist	23	23.5	24	25	26	27	28	30	32	34
Hip	31	32	33	34	35	36	37	39	41	43

Misses' sizes (PS 42-70) (1971)
5'2 1/2"–5'6 1/2" tall, average bust, average back
Dimension/size	6	8	10	12	14	16	18	20	22
Bust	31 1/2	32 1/2	33 1/2	35	36 1/2	38	40	42	44
Waist	22 1/2	23 1/2	24 1/2	26	27 1/2	29	31	33	35
Hip	33 1/2	34 1/2	35 1/2	37	38 1/2	40	42	44	46
Back-waist length	14 1/2	15	15 1/4	15 1/2	15 3/4	16	16 1/4	16 1/2	16 3/4

Misses' sizes (ASTM D5585 95 (R2001)) (1995, revised 2001)
5'3 1/2" - 5 ft 8 in tall
Dimension/size	2	4	6	8	10	12	14	16	18	20
Bust	32	33	34	35	36	37 1/2	39	40 1/2	42 1/2	44 1/2
Waist	24	25	26	27	28	29 1/2	31	32 1/2	34 1/2	36 1/2
Hip	34 1/2	35 1/2	36 1/2	37 1/2	38 1/2	40	41 1/2	43	45	47

Misses' sizes (ASTM D5585 11e1) (2011)
5'5 1/2" tall
Dimension/size	00	0	2	4	6	8	10	12	14	16	18	20
Bust	31 1/8	31 3/4	33	34 1/8	35 1/4	36 1/4	37 1/4	38 3/4	40 3/8	42 1/8	44	46
Waist (Straight)	25 3/8	26 1/8	26 7/8	27 5/8	28 1/2	29 1/2	30 1/2	32 1/4	34	36	38 1/4	40 1/2
Waist (Curvy)	23 7/8	24 5/8	25 3/8	26 1/8	27	28	29	30 3/4	32 1/2	34 1/2	36 3/4	39
Hip (Straight)	33 1/4	33 7/8	35 1/8	36 3/8	37 1/2	38 1/2	39 1/2	41	42 1/2	44 1/4	46	48
Hip (Curvy)	34	34 5/8	35 7/8	37 1/8	38 1/4	39 1/4	40 1/4	41 3/4	43 1/4	45	46 3/4	48 3/4

Misses' sizes
5 ft 5 in–5 ft 9 in (165–175 cm) tall, average bust, average back
Dimension/size	4	6	8	10	12	14	16
Bust	32-34	34	35 1/2	36 1/2	38	39 1/2	41
Waist	22-24 1/2	25 1/2	27 1/2	29	30	31 1/2	33
Hip	33-35 1/2	36 1/2	38	39	41	42 1/2	44
Back-waist length	14 1/2	14 3/4	15 3/4	16	16 1/4	16 1/2	16 3/4

Miss petite sizes
5 ft 1 in–5 ft 3 in (157.5–160 cm) tall, average bust, shorter back
Dimension/size	4mp	6mp	8mp	10mp	12mp	14mp	16mp
Bust	32-34	34	35	36	37 1/2	39	40 1/2
Waist	21-23 1/2	24 1/2	26 1/2	27 1/2	29	30 1/2	32
Hip	34-35 1/2	36 1/2	38 1/2	39 1/2	41	42 1/2	44
Back-waist length	14	14 1/2	14 3/4	15	15 1/4	15 1/2	15 3/4

Junior sizes
5 ft 4 in–5 ft 5 in (162.5–165 cm) tall, higher bust, shorter back
Dimension/size	3	5	7	9	11	13	15	17	19
Bust	30	31	32	33	34	35	36	37	38
Waist	22	23	24	25	26	27	28	29	30
Hips	32	33	34	35	36	37	38	39	40
Back-waist length	13.75	14	14.25	14.5	14.75	15	15.25	15.5	15.75

Junior petite sizes
5 ft 1 in (155 cm) tall, average bust, shorter back
Dimension/size	3jp	5jp	7jp	9jp	11jp	13jp
Bust	30.5	31	32	33	34	35
Waist	22.5	23	24	25	26	27
Hip	31.5	32	33	34	35	36
Back-waist length	14	14.25	14.5	14.75	15	15.25

Young junior sizes
5 ft 1 in–5 ft 3 in (155–160 cm) tall, higher bust, shorter back
Dimension/size	5/6	7/8	9/10	11/12	13/14	15/16
Bust	28	29	30.5	32	33.5	35
Waist	22	23	24	25	26	27
Hip	31	32	33.5	35	36.5	38
Back-waist length	13.5	14	14.5	15	15.5	16

Women's sizes
5 ft 5 in–5 ft 6 in (165–168 cm) tall, average bust, average back
Dimension/size	34	36	38	40	42	44	46	48	50
Bust	38	40	42	44	46	48	50	52	54
Waist	30	32	34	35.5	37.5	39.5	41.5	43.5	45.5
Hip	39	41	43	46	48	50	52	54	56
Back-waist length	17 1/4	17 3/8	17 1/2	17 5/8	17 3/4	17 7/8	18		

Half-sizes
5 ft 2 in–5 ft 3 in (157.5–160 cm) tall, lower bust, shorter back
Dimension/size	10 1/2	12 1/2	14 1/2	16 1/2	18 1/2	20 1/2	22 1/2	24 1/2
Bust	33	35	37	39	41	43	45	47
Waist	27	29	31	33	35	37 1/2	40	42 1/2
Hip	35	37	39	41	43	45 1/2	48	50 1/2
Back-waist length	15	15 1/4	15 1/2	15 3/4	15 7/8	16	16 1/8	16 1/4

== Girls' sizes ==
Girls' sizes
Dimension/size	7	8	10	12	14	16
Chest	25.5	26	28	30	32	34
Waist	22.5	23	24	25	26	27
Hip	26.5	27	29	31	33	35
Height	52	54	57	60	64	67

== Boys' sizes ==
Boys' sizes
Dimension/size	7	8	10	12	14	18	20	22
Chest	26	27	28	30	32	33 1/2	35	40
Waist	23	24	25	26	27	28	29	30
Hip	27	28	29 1/2	31	32 1/2	34	35 1/2	37
Neckband	11 3/4	12	12 1/2	13	13 1/2	14	14 1/2	15
Height	48	50	54	58	61	64	66	68

== Children's sizes ==
Children's sizes
Dimension/size	1	2	3	4	5	6	6X
Chest	18.5	20	20.5	21.5	22	23	
Waist	17	18.5	19	20	20.5	21	21.5
Hip	19	20	21	22	23	24	24 1/2
Height	31	34	37	40	43	46	48
Back-waist length	8 1/4	8 1/2	9	9 1/2	10	10 1/2	10 3/4
Finished dress length	17	18	19	20	22	24	25

== Baby sizes ==
Infant sizes
Dimension/size	NB	0-3 mo	3-6 mo	6-9 mo	9-12 mo	18 mo	24 mo
Weight	5–8 lb	8–12 1/2 lb	12 1/2–16 1/2 lb	16 1/2-20 1/2	20 1/2–24 1/2 lb	24 1/2–27 1/2 lb	27 1/2–30 lb
Height	less than 21 1/2 in	21 1/2–24 in	24–26 1/2 in	26 1/2–28 1/2 in	28 1/2–30 1/2 in	30 1/2–32 1/2 in	32 1/2–34 in.

Toddlers' sizes
Dimension/size	1/2	1	2	3	4
Chest	18.5	19	19.5	20	20.5
Waist	17	17.5	18	19.5	20
Height	28	31	34	37	40
Finished dress length	14	15	16	17	18

== Conversion from catalog sizes ==
Companies who publish catalogs may provide the measurements for their sizes, which may vary even among different styles of the same type of garment. The sizes seen in catalogs generally have roughly the following measurements:

Catalog misses' sizes: 5 ft 5 in-5 ft 6 in (165–168 cm) tall, average bust, average back
Dimension/size	4	6	8	10	12	14	16	18	20
Closest standard size	10	12	14		16	18		20	22
Est. height	5 ft 4 in (162.5 cm)	5 ft 4 in (162.5 cm)	5 ft 4.5 in (164 cm)	5 ft 5 in (165 cm)	5 ft 4 in (162.5 cm)	5 ft 6.5 in (169 cm)	5 ft 6 in (168 cm)	5 ft 6 in (168 cm)	5 ft 6.5 in (169 cm)
Est. weight lb (kg)	115 (52)	125 (57)	135 (61)	145 (66)	155 (70)	165 (75)	175 (79)	180 (81.5)	195 (88.5)
Bust	34	35	36	37	38.5	40	41.5	43	44.5
Waist	25	26	27	28	29.5	31	32.5	34	35.5
Hip	35.5	36.5	37.5	38.5	40	41.5	43	44.5	46

Catalog women's petite (half-sizes): 5 ft 1/2 in-5 ft 4 in (153-162.5 cm) tall, lower bust, shorter back
Dimension/size					18W	20W	22W	24W	26W
Closest standard size	12 1/2	14 1/2	16 1/2	18 1/2	20 1/2	22 1/2	24 1/2	26 1/2	28 1/2
Est. height	5 ft 1/2 in (153 cm)	5 ft 1 in (155 cm)	5 ft 1.5 in (156 cm)	5 ft 2 in (157.5 cm)	5 ft 2.5 in (159 cm)	5 ft 3 in (160 cm)	5 ft 3 in (160 cm)	5 ft 3.5 in (161 cm)	5 ft 4 in (162.5 cm)
Est. weight lb (kg)	125 (57)	140 (63.5)	155 (70)	170 (77)	180 (81.5)	190 (86)	215 (97.5)	225 (102)	235 (106.5)
Bust	36	38	40	42	43.5	45.5	47.5	49.5	51.5
Waist	28	30	32	34	35	37	39	41	43
Hip	38	40	42	44	45.5	47.5	49.5	52	53.5

Catalog women's sizes: 5 ft 5 in-5 ft 6.5 in (165–169 cm) tall, average bust, average back
Dimension/size									
Closest standard size	2	4	6	8	10	12	14	16	18
Est. height	5 ft 5 in (165 cm)	5 ft 5.5 in (166 cm)	5 ft 6 in (168 cm)	5 ft 6 in (168 cm)	5 ft 6.5 in (169 cm)	5 ft 6.5 in (169 cm)	5 ft 6.5 in (169 cm)	5 ft 6.5 in (169 cm)	5 ft 6.5 in (169 cm)
Est. weight lb (kg)	145 (66)	160 (72.5)	175 (79)	190 (86)	205 (93)	220 (100)	235 (106.5)	250 (113)	265 (120)
Bust	38	40	42	44	46	48	50	52	54
Waist	30	32	34	35.5	37.5	39.5	41.5	43.5	45.5
Hip	39	41	43	46	48	50	52	54	56

With the average American woman's height (20 years and older) at about 5 ft 4 in (162.1 cm) (Department of Health 2012), both standard and catalog size ranges attempt to address a variety of weights or builds as well as providing for the "shorter-than-average" height woman with "petite" and "half-sizes". However "taller-than-average" women may find their size-height addressed by manufacturers less frequently, and may often find themselves facing issues of slightly too short pant legs and sleeve cuffs, as well as waist lengths.

== Standards ==
Current and former national standards:

- ASTM D5585-95, 2001, Standard Table of Body Measurements for Adult Female
- ASTM D6829-02, 2008, Standard Tables of Body Measurements for Juniors
- ASTM D5585-11, 2011, Standard Tables of Body Measurements for Adult Female Misses Figure Type, Size Range 00–20
- ASTM D6240-98, 2006, ASTM D6240-98 Standard Tables of Body Measurements for Men Sizes Thirty-Four to Sixty (34 to 60)
- ASTM D6458-99, 2006, Standard Tables of Body Measurements for Boys, Sizes 8 to 14 Slim and 8 to 20 Regular
- ASTM D6960-04, 2004, Standard Table of Body Measurements Relating to Women's Plus Size Figure Type, Sizes 14W-32W
- CS-151-50 - Infants', Babies', Toddlers' and Children's clothing
- CS-215-58, 1958 - Body measurements for the sizing of Women's patterns and apparel
- PS 42-70, 1971 - Women's Clothing
- PS 36-70 - Boys' Clothing
- PS 45-71 - Young Men's clothing
- PS 54-72 - Girls' Clothing

== See also ==
- Clothing sizes
- EN 13402
- Vanity sizing
- Petite size
