= Christopher Lee Sauvé =

Canadian pop artist (born 1979)

Christopher Lee Sauvé (born August 21, 1979) is a Canadian pop artist. He is known for his controversial artwork in which he lampoons and satirizes high-profile figures in the fashion industry. Sauvé works in the fashion industry in New York City, and acts as a creative director for fashion clients including Diane Von Furstenberg, Alexander Wang, Michael Kors, Dior, Coach, Under Armour, MAC Cosmetics and Sephora.

== Early life and education ==
Sauvé was born in Vancouver, British Columbia. He earned a Bachelor of Fine Arts degree from Emily Carr University.

== Career ==
Sauvé moved to New York City in 2004. He created paintings and earned a living creating posters for rock shows and theatre productions. In 2008, Sauvé designed a T-shirt silk screen with a picture of Vogue editor Anna Wintour and the caption "SAVE ANNA." When his creation proved popular, he created a line of T-shirts with fashion commentary. Some of the designs have produced negative reactions.

In 2010, he created a protest against Terry Richardson for his alleged misconduct with fashion models.

In 2015, Sauvé launched his new series titled Madmaus at Hotel Particulier in Soho, New York City. The show received positive reviews and Fabergé chose Sauvé to participate in the Big Egg Hunt, where the artist created a Madmaus egg sculpture.

Sauvé also collaborated with artists Malarko Hernandez and Upendo Taylor to create a line of stylish exercise clothing.
