= Joint European standard for size labelling of clothes =

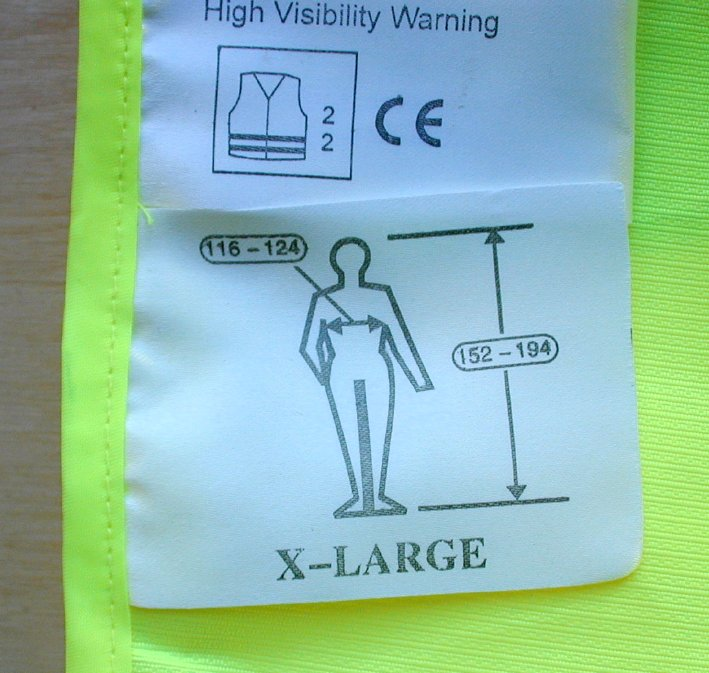
Clothes-size label with EN 13402-1 pictogram and body dimensions in centimeters (found on a high-visibility jacket sold in the United Kingdom).

The joint European standard for size labelling of clothes, formally known as the EN 13402 Size designation of clothes, is a European standard for labelling clothes sizes. The standard is based on body dimensions measured in centimetres and its aim is to make it easier for people to find clothes in sizes that fit them.

The standard aims to replace older clothing size systems that were in popular use before the year 2007, but the degree of its adoption has varied between countries. For bras, gloves and children's clothing it is already the de facto standard in most of Europe. Few countries are known to have followed suit.

The Spanish Ministry of Health and Consumer Affairs has commissioned a study to categorize female body types with a view to harmonising Spanish clothing sizes with EN-13402.

== Background ==
There are three approaches towards size-based labelling of clothes:

Body dimensions
The label states the range of body measurements for which the product was designed. (For example: a bike helmet label stating "head girth: 56–60 cm" or shoes labeled "foot length: 280 mm")
Product dimensions
The label states characteristic dimensions of the product. (For example: a jeans label stating the inner leg length of the jeans in centimeters or inches, but not the inner leg measurement of the intended wearer)
Ad hoc sizes or vanity sizes
The label states a size number or code with no obvious relationship to any measurement. (For example: Size 12, XL)

Traditionally, clothes have been labelled using many different ad hoc size systems. This approach has led to a number of problems:

- For many types of garments, size cannot be adequately described by a single number, because a good fit requires a match between two (or sometimes three) independent body dimensions. This is a common issue in sizing jeans.
- Ad hoc sizes have changed with time, due to changing demographics and increasing rates of obesity. This has been characterised in media as vanity sizing.
- Scalar ad hoc sizes based on 1950s anthropometric studies are no longer adequate, as changes in nutrition and lifestyle have shifted the distribution of body dimensions.
- Mail order requires accurate methods for predicting the best-fitting size.
- Country-specific and vendor-specific labels incur additional costs.

Therefore, in 1996, the European standards committee CEN/TC 248/WG 10 started the process of designing a new, modern system of labelling clothes sizes, resulting in the standard EN 13402 "Size designation of clothes".

It is based on:

- body dimensions
- the metric system (SI)
- data from new anthropometric studies of the European population performed in the late 1990s
- similar existing international standards (ISO 3635, etc.)

== EN 13402-1: Terms, definitions and body measurement procedure ==
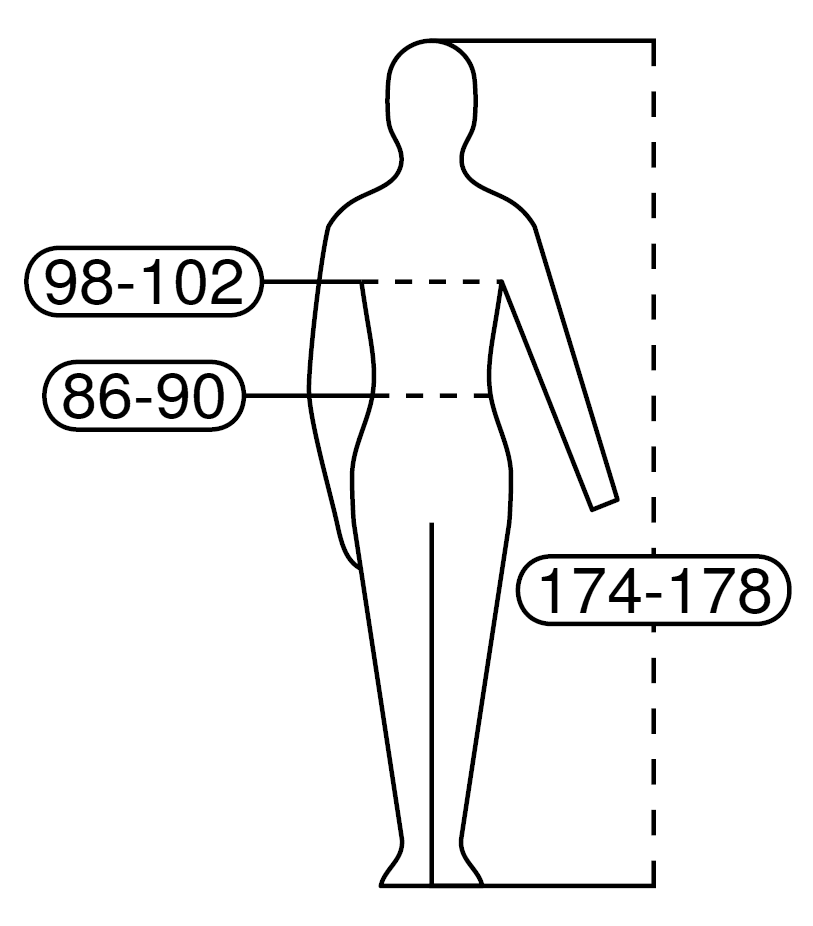
European Standard (EN 13402-1) pictogram example for a men's jacket, with chest as primary measurement, and height and waist as secondary measurements.

The first part of the standard defines the list of body dimensions to be used for designating clothing sizes, together with an anatomical explanations and measurement guidelines. All body dimensions (excluding one's body mass) are measured in centimetres, preferably without clothes on, or with the underwear the wearer expects to be wearing underneath the garment.

The standard also defines a pictogram that can be used in language-neutral labels to indicate one or several of the following body dimensions.

Head girth
Maximum horizontal girth (circumference) of the head, measured above the ears
Neck girth
Girth of the neck measured with the tape measure passed 2 cm below the Adam's apple, and at the level of the 7th cervical vertebra

Chest girth (♂ men)
Maximum horizontal girth measured during normal breathing, with the subject standing erect and the tape measure passed over the shoulder blades (scapulae), under the armpits (axillae), and across the chest
Bust girth (♀ women)
Maximum horizontal girth measured during normal breathing with the subject standing erect and the tape measure passed horizontally under the armpits (axillae) and across the bust prominence (preferably measured with moderate tension over a brassiere that is expected to be worn underneath)
Underbust girth (♀ women)
Horizontal girth of the body measured just below the breasts
Waist girth
Girth of the natural waistline between the top of the hip bones (iliac crests) and the lower ribs, measured with the subject breathing normally and standing erect with the abdomen relaxed
Hip girth (♀ women)
Horizontal girth measured round the buttocks at the level of maximum circumference
Height
Vertical distance between the crown of the head and the soles of the feet, measured with the subject standing erect, without shoes and with the feet together (for infants not yet able to stand upright: length of the body measured in a straight line from the crown of the head to the soles of the feet)
Inside leg length
Distance between the crotch and the soles of the feet, measured in a straight vertical line with the subject erect, feet slightly apart, and the weight of the body equally distributed on both legs
Arm length
Distance, measured using the tape measure, from the armscye/shoulder line intersection (acromion), over the elbow, to the far end of the prominent wrist bone (ulna), with the subject's right fist clenched and placed on the hip, and with the arm bent at 90°
Hand girth
Maximum girth measured over the knuckles (metacarpals) of the open right hand, fingers together and thumb excluded
Foot length
Horizontal distance between perpendiculars, in contact, with the end of the most prominent toe and the most prominent part of the heel, measured with the subject standing barefoot and the weight of the body equally distributed on both feet
Body mass
Measured with a suitable balance in kilograms.

== EN 13402-2: Primary and secondary dimensions ==
The second part of the standard defines for each type of garment one "primary dimension". This is the body measure according to which the product must be labelled. Where men's garments use the chest girth, women's clothes are designed for a certain bust girth.

For some types of garment, a single measure may not be sufficient to select the right product. In these cases, one or two "secondary dimensions" can be added to the label.

The following table shows the primary (in bold) and secondary dimensions listed in the standard, leaving out the redundant words girth, length and size for better overview.

| Garment | Men | Women | Boys | Girls |
|---|---|---|---|---|
| Jackets | **chest**, height, waist | **bust**, height, hip | **height**, chest | **height**, bust |
| Suits | **chest, waist**, height, inside leg | **bust**, height, hip | **height**, chest | **height**, bust |
| Overcoats | **chest**, height | **bust**, height | **height**, chest | **height**, bust |
| Trousers/shorts | **waist**, height, inside leg | **waist**, height, hip, inside leg | **height**, waist | **height**, waist |
| Skirts | — | **waist**, height, hip | — | **height**, waist |
| Dresses | — | **bust**, height, hip, waist | — | **height**, bust |
| Knits: cardigans, sweaters, T-shirts | **chest**, height | **bust**, height | **height**, chest | **height**, bust |
| Shirts (m), Blouses (f) | **neck**, height, arm | **bust**, height | **height**, neck | **height**, bust |
| Underpants | **waist**, height | **waist**, height, hip | **height**, waist | **height**, waist |
| Vest | **chest**, height | **bust**, height | **height**, chest | **height**, bust |
| Pyjamas, Ladies' nightdresses | **chest**, height, waist | **bust**, height, waist, hip | **height**, chest | **height**, bust |
| Swim-suits/wear and bodies | **waist**, height, chest | **bust**, height, hip, underbust | **height**, chest, waist | **height**, underbust, bust |
| Bras | — | **underbust, bust**, cup | — | **underbust, bust**, cup |
| Corsetry/upper and full body | — | **underbust, bust**, height, hip, waist | — | — |
| Corsetry/lower body | — | **waist, hip**, height | — | — |
| Pantyhose | — | **height**, waist, weight | — | **height** |
| Stockings | — | **foot** | | |
| Socks | **foot** | | | |
| Gloves | **hand** | | | |
| Headwear | **head** | | | |

== EN 13402–3: Measurements and intervals ==
The third part of the standard defines preferred numbers of primary and secondary body dimensions.

The product should not be labelled with the average body dimension for which the garment was designed (i.e., not "height: 176 cm."). Instead, the label should show the range of body dimensions from half the step size below to half the step size above the design size (e.g., "height: 172–180 cm.").

For heights, for example, the standard recommends generally to use the following design dimensions, with a step size of 8 cm:

| Height | ... | 160 | 168 | 176 | 184 | 192 | 200 | ... |
| Range | ... | 156–164 | 164–172 | 172–180 | 180–188 | 188–196 | 196–204 | ... |

For trousers, the recommended step size for height is 4 cm:

| Height | ... | 156 | 160 | 164 | 168 | 172 | 176 | 180 | 184 | 188 | 192 | 196 | 200 | ... |
| Range | ... | 154–158 | 158–162 | 162–166 | 166–170 | 170–174 | 174–178 | 178–182 | 182–186 | 186–190 | 190–194 | 194–198 | 198–202 | ... |

The standard defines similar tables for other dimensions and garments, only some of which are shown here.

=== Men ===
The standard sizes and ranges for chest and waist girth are defined in steps of 4 cm:

Men's standard sizes for drop = −12 cm
| Chest girth | 84 | 88 | 92 | 96 | 100 | 104 | 108 | 112 | 116 | 120 | 126 | 132 | 138 | 144 |
| Range | 82–86 | 86–90 | 90–94 | 94–98 | 98–102 | 102–106 | 106–110 | 110–114 | 114–118 | 118–123 | 123–129 | 129–135 | 135–141 | 141–147 |
| Waist girth | 72 | 76 | 80 | 84 | 88 | 92 | 96 | 100 | 104 | 108 | 114 | 120 | 126 | 132 |
| Range | 70–74 | 74–78 | 78–82 | 82–86 | 86–90 | 90–94 | 94–98 | 98–102 | 102–106 | 106–111 | 111–117 | 117–123 | 123–129 | 129–135 |

drop = waist girth − chest girth.

Example: While manufacturers will typically design clothes for chest girth = 100 cm such that it fits waist girth = 88 cm, they may also want to combine that chest girth with neighbouring waist girth step sizes 84 cm or 92 cm, to cover these drop types (−16 cm and −8 cm) as well.

The standard also suggests that neck girth can be associated with chest girth:

Association of neck and chest girth
| Neck girth | 37 | 38 | 39 | 40 | 41 | 42 | 43 | 44 | 45 | 46.5 | 48 | 49.5 | 51 |
| Range | 36.5–37.5 | 37.5–38.5 | 38.5–39.5 | 39.5–40.5 | 40.5–41.5 | 41.5–42.5 | 42.5–43.5 | 43.5–44.5 | 44.5–45.8 | 45.8–47.3 | 47.3–48.8 | 48.8–50.3 | 50.3–51.1 |
| Chest girth | 88 | 92 | 96 | 100 | 104 | 108 | 112 | 116 | 120 | 126 | 132 | 138 | 144 |

The standard further suggests that arm length can be associated with height:

Association of arm length and body height
| Height | 156 | 160 | 164 | 168 | 172 | 176 | 180 | 184 | 188 | 192 | 196 | 200 |
| Arm length | 60 | 61 | 62 | 63 | 64 | 65 | 66 | 67 | 68 | 69 | 70 | 71 |
| Range | 59–60 | 60–61 | 61–62 | 62–63 | 63–64 | 64–65 | 65–66 | 66–67 | 67–68 | 68–69 | 69–70 | 70–71 |

=== Women ===
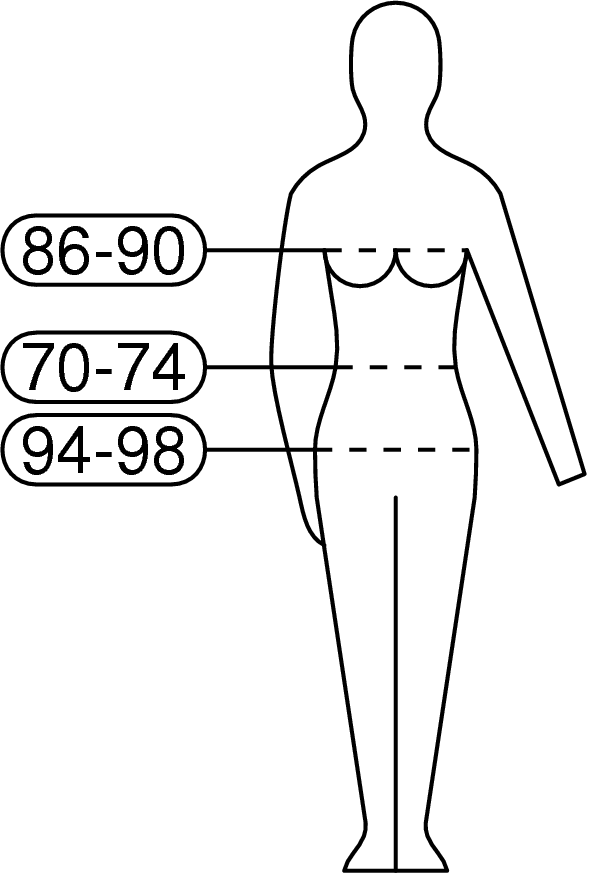
EN 13402–1 pictogram example for dress size 88–72–96

==== Dress sizes ====
The standard sizes and ranges for bust, waist and hip girth are mostly based on a step of 4 cm, for larger sizes 5 cm (hip) or 6 cm (bust and waist):

Women's standard sizes for drop = −16 cm
| Bust girth | 76 | 80 | 84 | 88 | 92 | 96 | 100 | 104 | 110 | 116 | 122 | 128 | 134 | 140 | 146 | 152 |
| Range | 74–78 | 78–82 | 82–86 | 86–90 | 90–94 | 94–98 | 98–102 | 102–107 | 107–113 | 113–119 | 119–125 | 125–131 | 131–137 | 137–143 | 143–149 | 149–155 |
| Waist girth | 60 | 64 | 68 | 72 | 76 | 80 | 84 | 88 | 94 | 100 | 106 | 112 | 118 | 124 | 130 | 136 |
| Range | 58–62 | 62–66 | 66–70 | 70–74 | 74–78 | 78–82 | 82–86 | 86–91 | 91–97 | 97–103 | 103–109 | 109–115 | 115–121 | 121–127 | 127–133 | 133–139 |
| Hip girth | 84 | 88 | 92 | 96 | 100 | 104 | 108 | 112 | 117 | 122 | 127 | 132 | 137 | 142 | 147 | 152 |
| Range | 82–86 | 86–90 | 90–94 | 94–98 | 98–102 | 102–106 | 106–110 | 110–115 | 115–120 | 120–125 | 125–130 | 130–135 | 135–140 | 140–145 | 145–150 | 150–155 |

==== Bra sizes ====
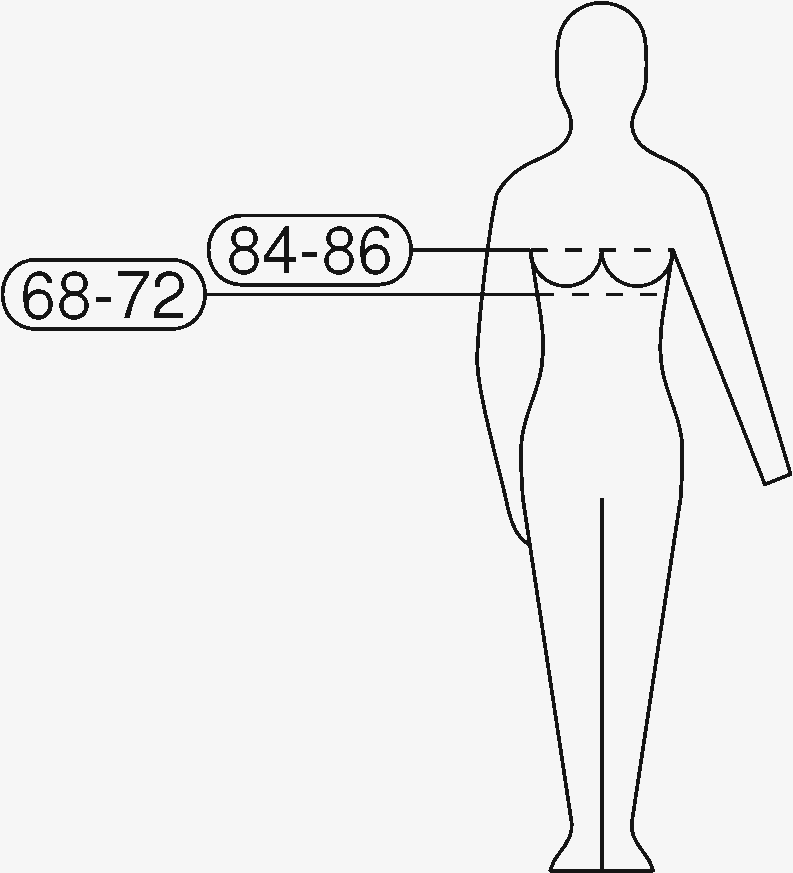
EN 13402–1 pictogram for bra size 70B

The European standard EN 13402 also defines bra sizes based on the "bust girth" and the "underbust girth". Bras are labeled with the under bust girth (rounded to the nearest multiple of 5 cm), followed by a letter code that indicates the "cup size" defined below, according to this table defined by the standard.

The standard sizes for brassiere are based on a step of 5 cm:

| Underbust girth | 60 | 65 | 70 | 75 | 80 | 85 | 90 | 95 | 100 | 105 | 110 | 115 | 120 | 125 |
| Range | 58–62 | 63–67 | 68–72 | 73–77 | 78–82 | 83–87 | 88–92 | 93–97 | 98–102 | 103–107 | 108–112 | 113–117 | 118–122 | 123–127 |

The secondary dimension cup size can be expressed in terms of the difference

cup size = bust girth − underbust girth

and can be labelled compactly using a letter code appended to the underbust girth:

| Code | AA | A | B | C | D | E | F | G | H |
| Cup size range | 10–12 | 12–14 | 14–16 | 16–18 | 18–20 | 20–22 | 22–24 | 24–26 | 26–28 |

Example 1
Bra size 70B is suitable for women with underbust girth 68–72 cm and bust girth from 82–84 cm to 86–88 cm.
Example 2
A woman with an underbust girth of 89 cm and a bust girth of 108 cm has cup size 19 cm (= 108 cm – 89 cm) or "D". Her underbust girth rounded to the nearest multiple of 5 cm is 90 cm. Therefore, her bra size according to the standard is 90D.

=== Letter codes ===
For clothes where a larger step size is sufficient, the standard also defines a letter code. This code represents the bust girth for women and the chest girth for men. The standard does not define such a code for children. Each range combines two adjacent size steps. The ranges could be extended below XXS or above 3XL if necessary.

| Meaning | Code | Chest girth (men) | Bust girth (women) |
|---|---|---|---|
| extra extra small | XXS | 70–78 | 66–74 |
| extra small | XS | 78–86 | 74–82 |
| small | S | 86–94 | 82–90 |
| medium | M | 94–102 | 90–98 |
| large | L | 102–110 | 98–107 |
| extra large | XL | 110–118 | 107–119 |
| extra extra large | XXL | 118–129 | 119–131 |
| extra extra extra large | 3XL | 129–141 | 131–143 |
| | 4XL | 141–154 | 143–155 |
| | 5XL | 154–166 | 155–167 |

== EN 13402-4: Coding system ==
The fourth part of the standard is still under review. It will define a compact coding system for clothes sizes. This was originally intended primarily for industry use in databases and as a part of stock-keeping identifiers and catalogue ordering numbers, but later users have also expressed a desire to use compact codes for customer communication. Writing out all the centimetre figures of all the primary and secondary measures from EN 13402-2 can – in some cases – require up to 12 digits. The full list of centimetre figures on the pictogram contains a lot of redundancy and the same information can be squeezed into fewer characters with lookup tables. EN 13402-4 will define such tables.

Dismissed 2005 draft: women's clothes, 3-digit codes
| Bust | | 68 | 72 | 76 | 80 | 84 | 88 | 92 | 96 | 100 | 104 | 110 | 116 | 122 | 128 | 134 | 140 | 146 | 152 | |
| Waist | | 52 | 56 | 60 | 64 | 68 | 72 | 76 | 80 | 84 | 88 | 94 | 100 | 106 | 112 | 118 | 124 | 130 | 136 | |
| Label | | XXS | | XS | | S | | M | | L | | XL | | XXL | | 3XL | | 4XL | | |
| Code | | 0__ | | 1__ | | 2__ | | 3__ | | 4__ | | 5__ | | 6__ | | 7__ | | 8__ | | |
|---|---|---|---|---|---|---|---|---|---|---|---|---|---|---|---|---|---|---|---|---|
| _0_ | | 68 | | 76 | | 84 | | 92 | | 100 | | 112 | | 122 | | 132 | | 142 | | |
| _1_ | _5_ | 72 | | 80 | | 88 | | 96 | | 106 | | 117 | | 127 | | 137 | | 147 | | |
| _2_ | _6_ | 76 | | 84 | | 92 | | 100 | | 112 | | 122 | | 132 | | 142 | | 152 | | |
| _3_ | _7_ | 80 | | 88 | | 96 | | 106 | | 117 | | 127 | | 137 | | 147 | | 157 | | |
| _4_ | _8_ | 84 | | 92 | | 100 | | 112 | | 122 | | 132 | | 142 | | 152 | | 162 | | |
| | _9_ | | 88 | | 96 | | 106 | | 117 | | 127 | | 137 | | 147 | | 157 | | 167 | |
| Height | | 152 | | 156 | | 160 | | 164 | | 168 | | 172 | | 176 | | 180 | | 184 | | 188 |
| Code | | __0 | | __1 | | __2 | | __3 | | __4 | | __5 | | __6 | | __7 | | __8 | | __9 |

An earlier draft of this part of the standard attempted to list all in-use combinations of EN 13402-3 measures and assigned a short 2- or 3-digit code to each. Some of the industry representatives involved in the standardization process considered this approach too restrictive. Others argued that the primary dimension in centimetres should be a prominent part of the code. Therefore, this proposal, originally expected to be adopted in 2005, was rejected.

Dismissed 2006 AEDT proposal: women's clothes
| Primary | Bust | 76 | 80 | 84 | 88 | 92 | 96 | 100 | 104 | 110 | 116 | 122 | 128 | 134 | 140 | 146 | 152 |
| Primary | Waist | 60 | 64 | 68 | 72 | 76 | 80 | 84 | 88 | 94 | 100 | 106 | 112 | 118 | 124 | 130 | 136 |
| Secondary | Code | A | B | C | D | E | F | G | H | I | J | | | | | | |
| Secondary | Hip-Bust | 0 | 4 | 8 | 12 | 16 | 20 | 24 | 28 | 32 | 36 | | | | | | |
| Secondary | Hip-Waist | 16 | 20 | 24 | 28 | 32 | 36 | 40 | 44 | 48 | 52 | | | | | | |
| Secondary | Height | 152 | 156 | 160 | 164 | 168 | 172 | 176 | 180 | 184 | 188 | | | | | | |

Since then, several new proposals have been presented to the CEN working group. One of these, tabled by the European Association of National Organisations of Textile Traders (AEDT), proposes a 5-character alphanumeric code, consisting of the 3-digit centimetre figure of the primary body dimension, followed by one or two letters that code a secondary dimension, somewhat like the system already defined for bra sizes. For example, an item designed for 100 cm bust girth, 104 cm hip girth and 176 cm height could bear the compact size code "100BG". This proposal was agreed upon in 2006, but later disregarded. A paper by Bogusławska-Bączek published in 2010 showed that there were still significant difficulties in identifying clothing sizes.

== Related links ==
- Clothing sizes
- Shoe size, hereunder the international Mondopoint
- U.S. standard clothing size
- Vanity sizing
