= M1 Garand =

American semi-automatic rifle

U.S. Rifle, Caliber .30, M1
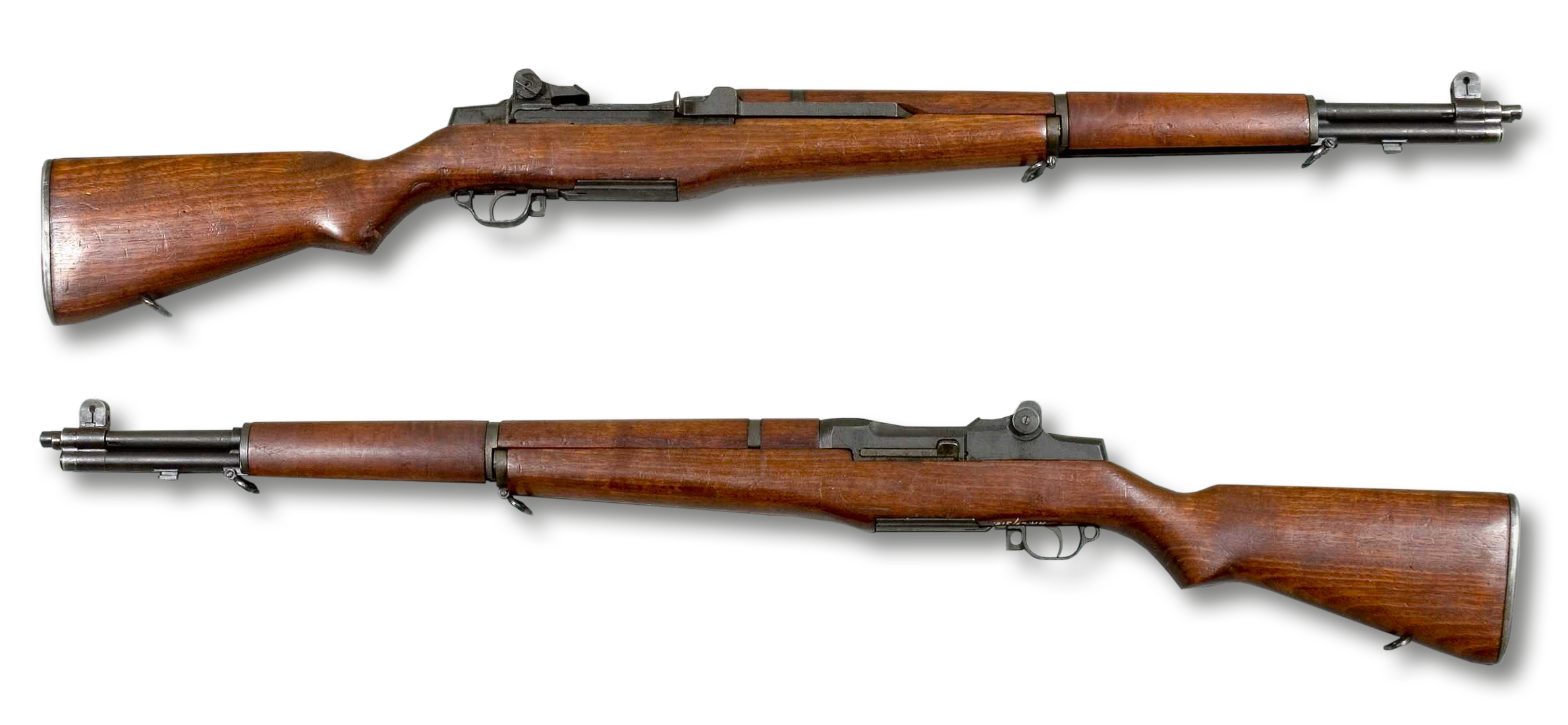
- M1 Garand rifle from the collection of the Swedish Army Museum, Stockholm
- Type: Semi-automatic rifle
- Place of origin: United States

Service history
- In service: 1936–1957 (as the standard U.S. service rifle); 1940s–present (other countries)
- Used by: See § Users
- Wars: List of conflicts: World War II; Chinese Civil War; Indonesian National Revolution; Korean War; 1948 Arab–Israeli War; Hukbalahap Rebellion; Indo-Pakistani Wars; First Indochina War; Algerian War; Suez Crisis; Second Taiwan Strait Crisis; 1958 Lebanon crisis; Cuban Revolution; Bay of Pigs Invasion; Vietnam War; Laotian Civil War; 1964 Ethiopian–Somali Border War; Dominican Civil War; Six-Day War; Football War; Cambodian Civil War; Moro conflict; Black September; Sandinista Revolution; Angolan Civil War; Lebanese Civil War; Iran–Iraq War; First Liberian Civil War; Gulf War; The Troubles; Operation Uphold Democracy; Maluku sectarian conflict; War in Afghanistan; Iraq War; Syrian civil war; Syrian civil war spillover in Lebanon; Islamic State insurgency in the Philippines; Twelve-Day War

Production history
- Designer: John C. Garand
- Designed: 1928
- Manufacturer: Military: Springfield Armory; Winchester; Harrington & Richardson; International Harvester; Beretta; Breda; F.M.A.P.; Civilian: Springfield Armory, Inc.; McCann Industries
- Unit cost: About $85 during World War II (equivalent to $1,580 in 2025)
- Produced: 1934–1957
- No. built: 5,468,772
- Variants: See § Variants

Specifications
- Mass: 9.5 lb (4.31 kg) to 11.6 lb (5.3 kg)
- Length: 43.5 in (1,100 mm)
- Barrel length: 24 in (610 mm)
- Cartridge: .30-06 Springfield; 7.62×51mm NATO
- Action: Gas-operated, closed rotating bolt
- Rate of fire: 40–50 rounds/min
- Muzzle velocity: 2,800 ft/s (853 m/s) (depending on ammuntion)
- Effective firing range: 500 yd (457 m)
- Feed system: 8-round en bloc clip, internal box magazine
- Sights: Rear: Adjustable aperture; Front: Wing protected post

The M1 Garand or M1 rifle (Note: Officially designated as U.S. rifle, caliber .30, M1, later simply called Rifle, Caliber .30, M1, also called US Rifle, Cal. .30, M1) is a semi-automatic rifle that was the service rifle of the U.S. Army and United States Marine Corps during World War II and the Korean War.

The rifle is chambered for the .30-06 Springfield cartridge and is named after its Canadian-American designer, John Garand. It was the first standard-issue autoloading rifle for the United States. By most accounts, the M1 rifle performed well. General George S. Patton called it "the greatest battle implement ever devised". The M1 replaced the (bolt-action) M1903 Springfield as the U.S. service rifle in 1936, and was itself replaced by the (selective-fire) M14 rifle on 26 March 1958.

== Pronunciation ==
Sources differ on the pronunciation of the M1 Garand. Some, such as General Julian Hatcher's The Book of the Garand (1948), give /ˈɡærənd/ GARR-ənd, identical to the pronunciation of John Garand's surname. However, a 1952 issue of Armed Forces Talk, a periodical published by the U.S. Department of Defense, gives the pronunciation as /ɡəˈrænd/ gə-RAND, saying "popular usage has placed the accent on the second syllable, so that the rifle has become the 'guh-RAND'". American Rifleman magazine, while acknowledging /ɡəˈrænd/ gə-RAND as the pronunciation favored by U.S. servicemen, deemed either pronunciation valid.

== History ==
=== Development ===
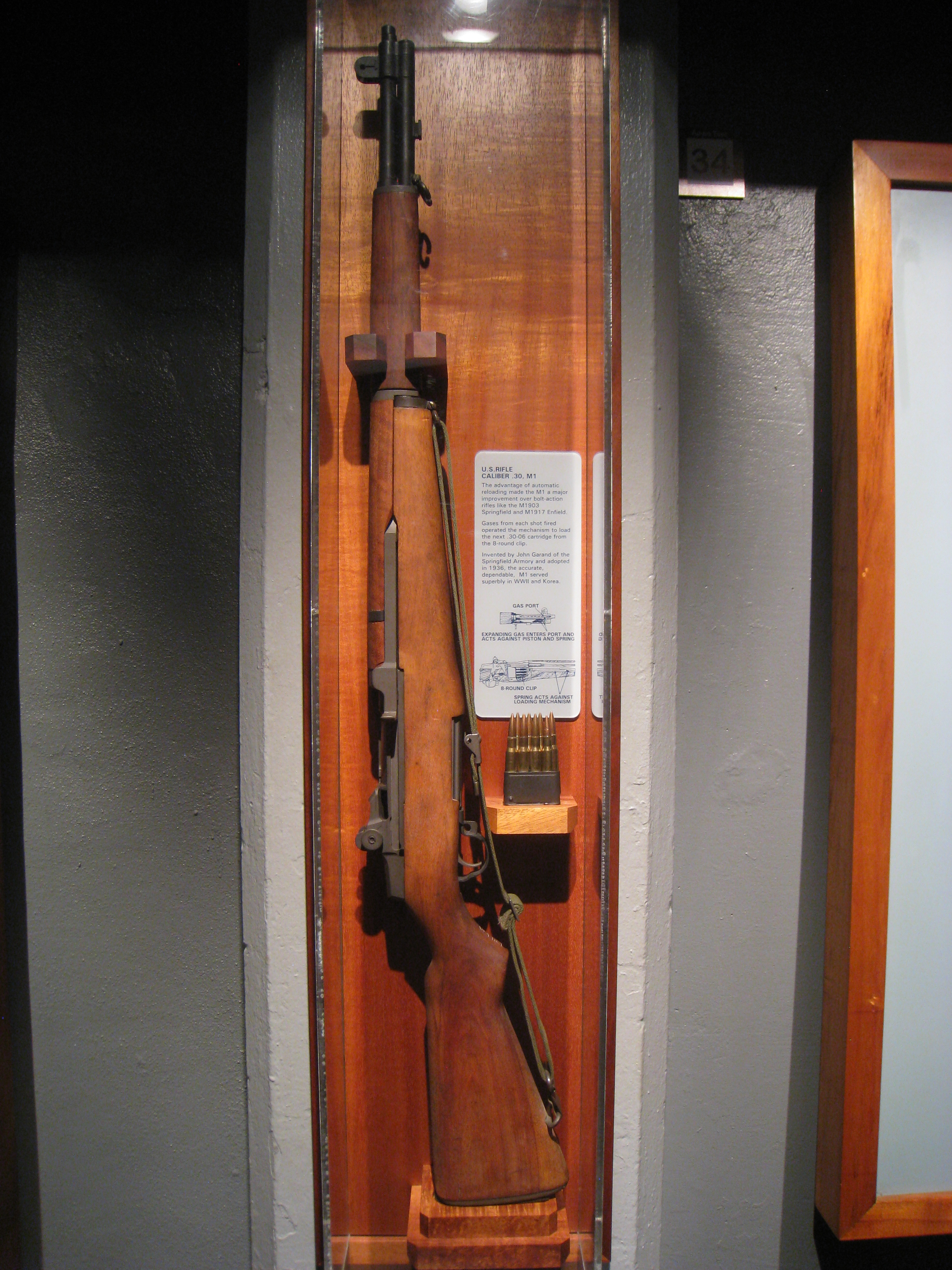
M1 Garand displayed with en bloc clip at U.S. Army Museum of Hawaii

Quebec-born Garand went to work at the United States Army's Springfield Armory and began working on a .30 caliber primer actuated blowback Model 1919 prototype. In 1924, twenty-four rifles, identified as "M1922s", were built at Springfield. At Fort Benning during 1925, they were tested against models by Berthier, Hatcher-Bang, Thompson, and Pedersen, the latter two being delayed blowback types. This led to a further trial of an improved "M1924" Garand against the Thompson, ultimately producing an inconclusive report. As a result, the Ordnance Board ordered a .30-06 Garand variant. In March 1927, the cavalry board reported trials among the Thompson, Garand, and '03 Springfield had not led to a clear winner. This led to a gas-operated .276 (7 mm) model (patented by Garand on 12 April 1930).

In early 1928, both the infantry and cavalry boards ran trials with the .276 Pedersen T1 rifle, calling it "highly promising" (despite its use of waxed ammunition, shared by the Thompson). On 13 August 1928, a semiautomatic rifle board (SRB) carried out joint Army, Navy, and Marine Corps trials among the .30 Thompson, both cavalry and infantry versions of the T1 Pedersen, "M1924" Garand, and .256 Bang, and on 21 September, the board reported no clear winner. The .30 Garand, however, was dropped in favor of the .276.

Further tests by the SRB in July 1929, which included rifle designs by Colt–Browning, Garand, Holek, Pedersen, Rheinmetall, Thompson, and an incomplete one by White, (Note: Additional trials in 1930 found Bostonian Joseph White's rifles insufficiently robust.) led to a recommendation that work on the (dropped) .30 gas-operated Garand be resumed, and a T1E1 was ordered 14 November 1929.

Twenty gas-operated .276 T3E2 Garands were made and competed with T1 Pedersen rifles in early 1931. The .276 Garand was the clear winner of these trials. The .30 caliber Garand was also tested, in the form of a single T1E1, but was withdrawn with a cracked bolt on 9 October 1931. A 4 January 1932 meeting recommended adoption of the .276 caliber and production of approximately 125 T3E2s. Meanwhile, Garand redesigned his bolt and his improved T1E2 rifle was retested. The day after the successful conclusion of this test, Army Chief of Staff General Douglas MacArthur personally disapproved any caliber change, in part because there were extensive existing stocks of .30 M1 ball ammunition. On 25 February 1932, Adjutant General John B. Shuman, speaking for the Secretary of War, ordered work on the rifles and ammunition in .276 caliber cease immediately and completely, and all resources be directed toward identification and correction of deficiencies in the Garand .30 caliber.

On 3 August 1933, the T1E2 became the "semi-automatic rifle, caliber 30, M1". In May 1934, 75 M1s went to field trials; 50 went to infantry, 25 to cavalry units. Numerous problems were reported, forcing the rifle to be modified, yet again, before it could be recommended for service and cleared for procurement on 7 November 1935, then standardized 9 January 1936. The first production model was successfully proof-fired, function-fired, and fired for accuracy on 21 July 1937.

Production difficulties delayed deliveries to the Army until September 1937. Machine production began at Springfield Armory that month at a rate of ten rifles per day, and reached an output of 100 per day within two years. Despite going into production status, design issues were not at an end. The barrel, gas cylinder, and front sight assembly were redesigned and entered production in early 1940. Existing "gas-trap" rifles were recalled and retrofitted, mirroring problems with the earlier M1903 Springfield rifle that also had to be recalled and reworked about three years into production and foreshadowing rework of the M16 rifle at a similar point in its development. Production of the Garand increased in 1940 despite these difficulties, reaching 600 a day by 10 January 1941, and the Army was fully equipped by the end of 1941. After the outbreak of World War II in Europe, Winchester was awarded an "educational" production contract for 65,000 rifles, with deliveries beginning in 1943.

=== Service use ===
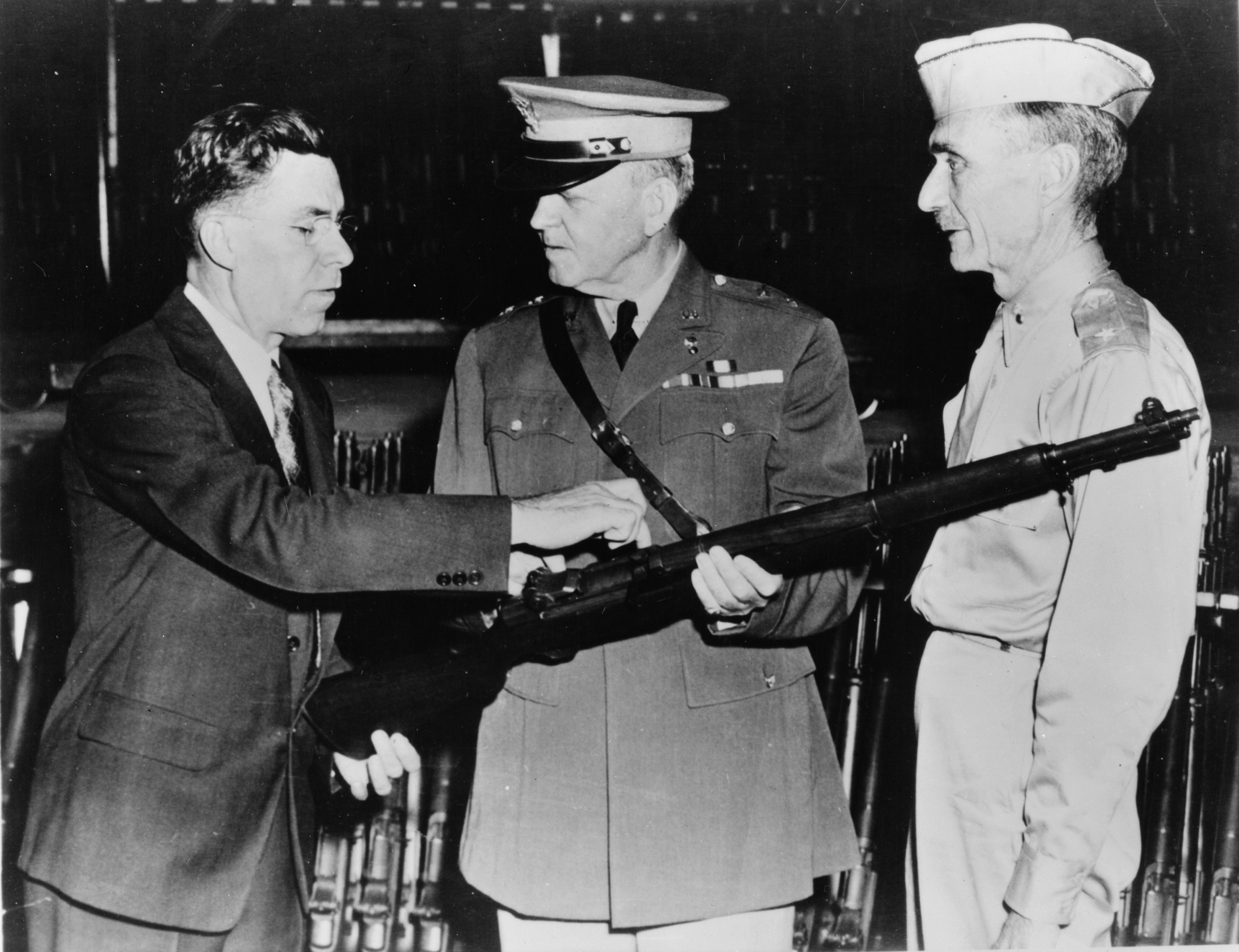
John Garand (left) points out features of the M1 to army generals

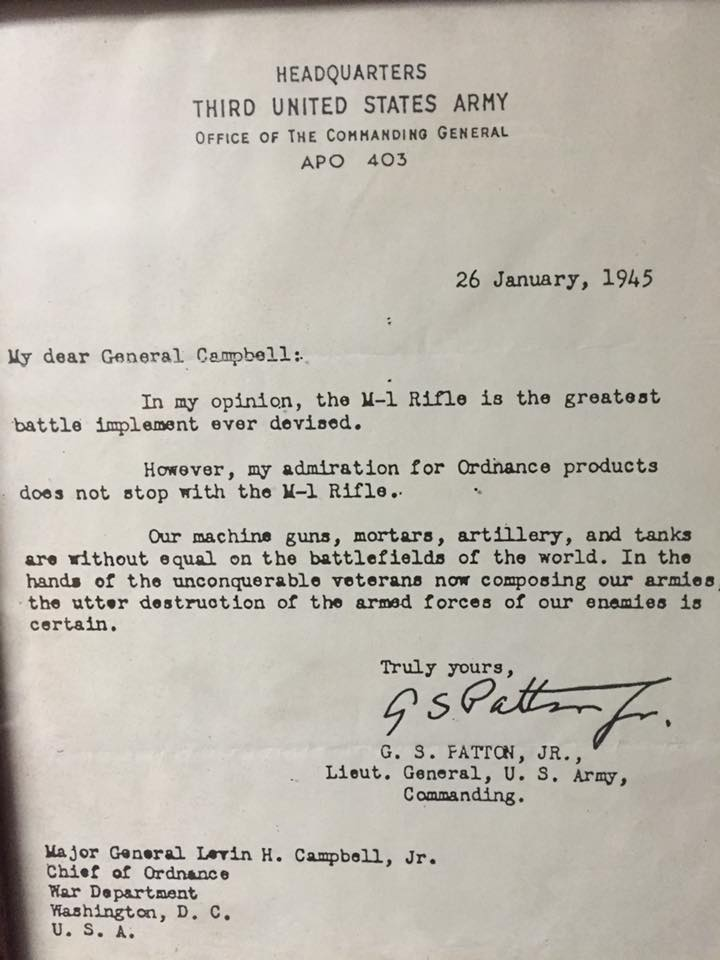
George Patton letter to Springfield Armory on the M1 Garand, 26 January 1945

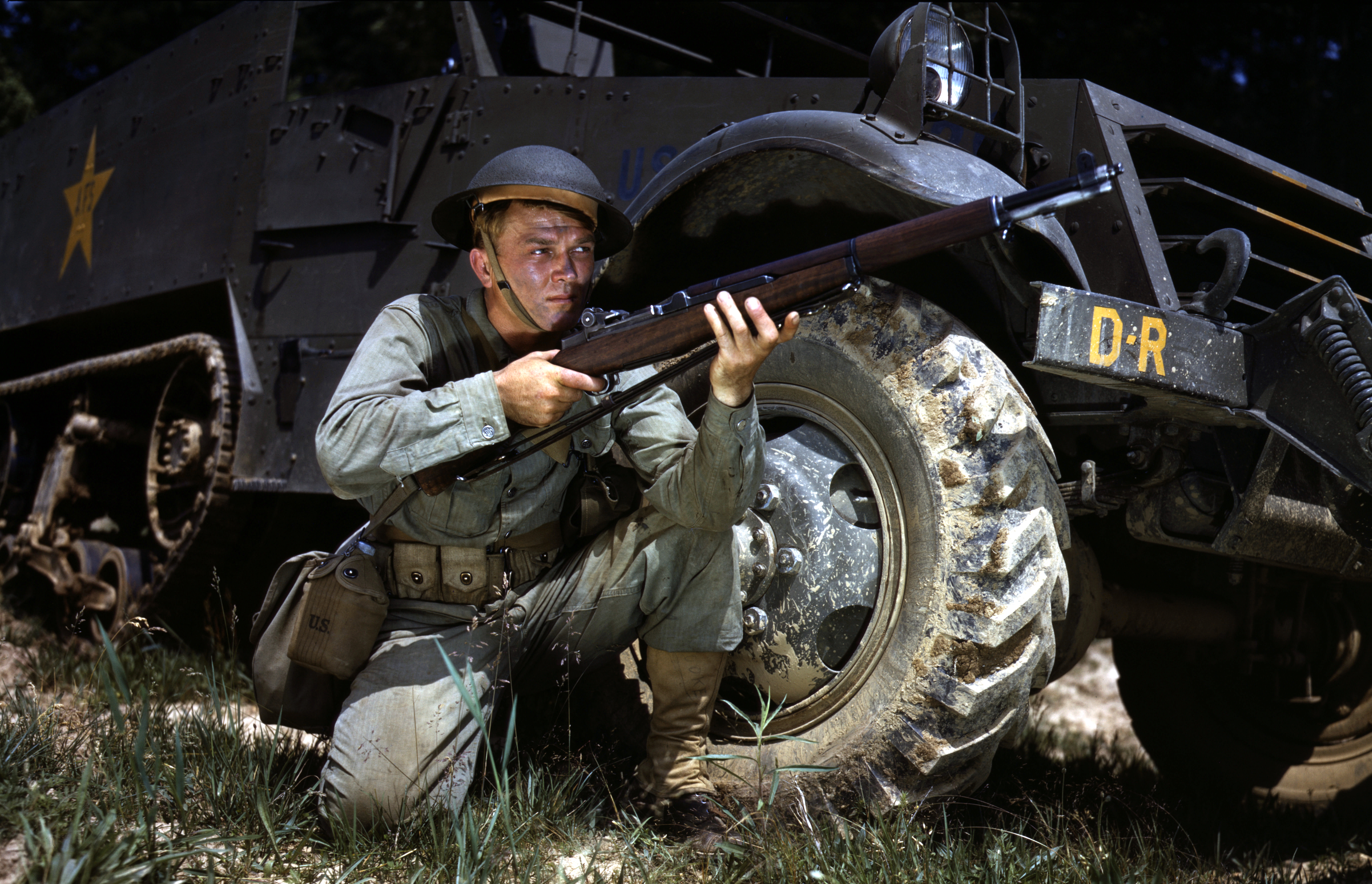
U.S. Army infantryman in 1942 with M1 in front of an M3 half-track at Fort Knox, Kentucky

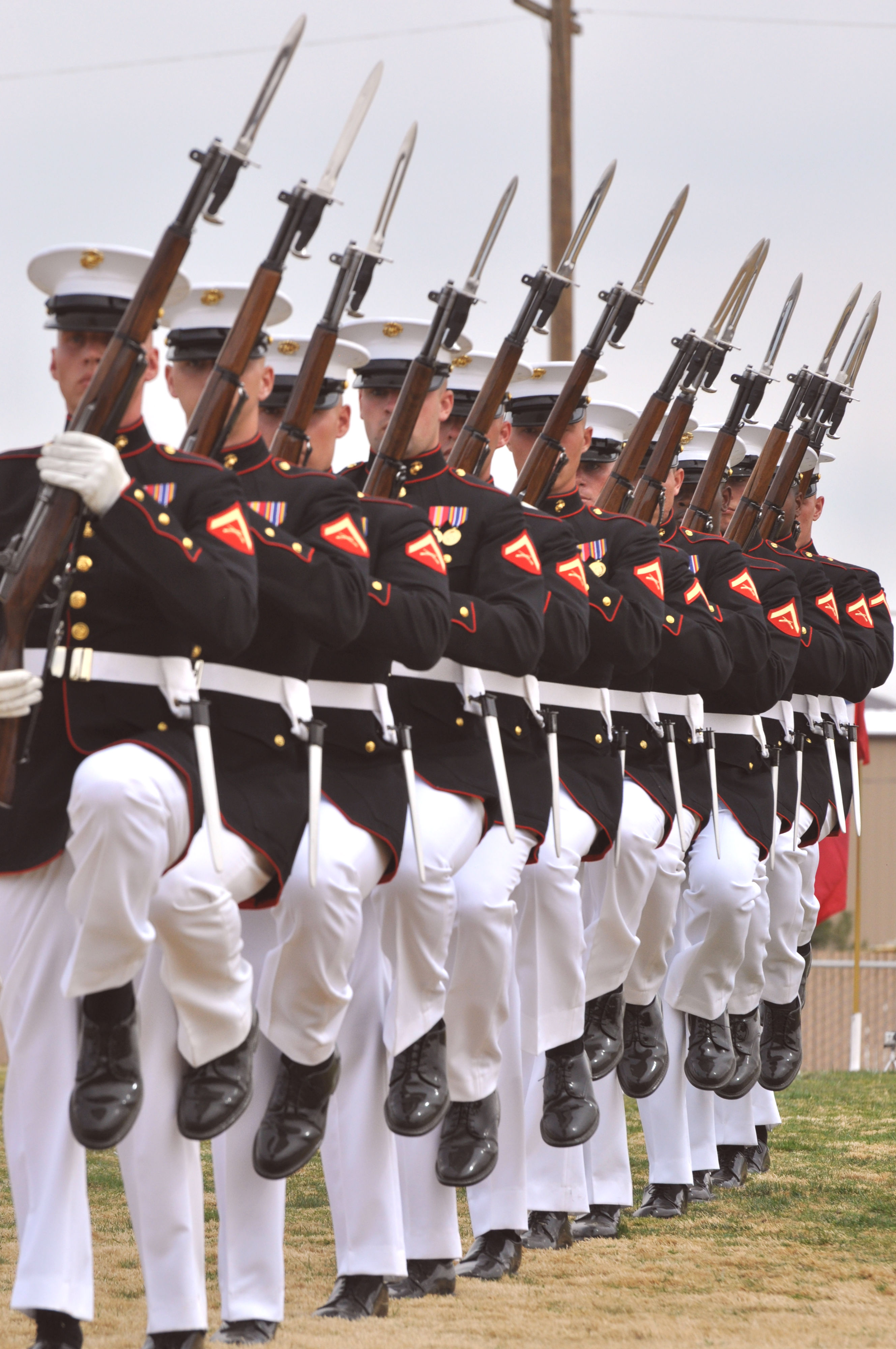
U.S. Marine Corps Silent Drill Team with M1 rifles

About 5.4 million M1 Garands were made during World War II. They were used by every branch of the United States military. The rifle generally performed well. The typical opponent of a US soldier during World War II was usually armed with a slower-firing bolt-action rifle (e.g., the Karabiner 98k for Germany, the Carcano M1891 for Italy, and the Type 38 or Type 99 Arisaka rifle for Japan). The effect of faster-firing infantry small arms in general soon stimulated both Allied and Axis forces to greatly increase their issue of semi- and fully automatic firearms then in production, and to develop new types of infantry firearms.

Many M1s were repaired or rebuilt after World War II. During the Korean War, the Department of Defense placed two contracts for new ones. Springfield Armory ramped up production, but two new contracts were awarded. From 1953 to 56, International Harvester produced 337,623 M1s. Harrington & Richardson also produced them. Springfield Armory produced a final, very small lot of M1s in early 1957, using finished components already on hand. Beretta also produced Garands using Winchester tooling.

In 1939, the British Army looked at the M1 as a possible replacement for its bolt-action –Enfield No.1 Mk. III, but decided against it as by January 1940 the Birmingham Small Arms Company was already preparing production of the Lee-Enfield No. 4 Mk 1. However, surplus M1 rifles were provided as foreign aid to American allies, including South Korea, West Germany, Italy, Japan, Denmark, Greece, Turkey, Iran, South Vietnam, the Philippines, etc. Most Garands shipped to allied nations were predominantly manufactured by International Harvester Corporation during the period of 1953–1956, and second from Springfield Armory from all periods.

Some Garands were still being used by the United States into the Vietnam War in 1963; despite the M14's official adoption in 1958, it was not until 1965 that the changeover from the M1 Garand was fully completed in the active-duty component of the Army (with the exception of the sniper variants, which were introduced in World War II and saw action in the Korean and Vietnam War). The Garand remained in service with the Army Reserve, Army National Guard, and the Navy into the early 1970s, being superseded by the M16A1 rifle for Army National Guard and Reserve component use starting in c. 1973. The South Korean army was using M1 Garands in the Vietnam War until the late 1960s.

Due to widespread United States military assistance as well as their durability, M1 Garands have also been found in use in recent conflicts such as with the insurgencies in Iraq and Afghanistan.

Some military drill teams still use the M1 rifle, including the U.S. Marine Corps Silent Drill Team, the United States Air Force Academy Cadet Honor Guard, the U.S. Air Force Auxiliary, almost all Reserve Officer Training Corps (ROTC) and some Junior Reserve Officer Training Corps (JROTC) teams of all branches of the U.S. military. It is also used by the drill team of His Majesty the King's Guard of Norway.

== Design details ==
=== Features ===
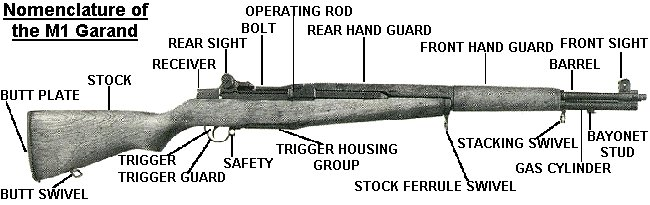
The M1 Garand with important parts labeled

The M1 rifle is a .30 caliber, gas-operated, eight-shot clip-fed, semi-automatic rifle. It is 43.6 inches (1,107 mm) long and it weighs about 9.5 pounds (4.31 kg).

The M1's safety catch is located at the front of the trigger guard, easily operated by the trigger finger. It is engaged when it is pressed rearward into the trigger guard, and disengaged when it is pushed forward and is protruding outside of the trigger guard.

The M1 Garand was designed for simple assembly and disassembly to facilitate field maintenance. It can be field stripped (broken down) without tools in just a few seconds.

The rifle has an iron sight line consisting of rear receiver aperture sight protected by sturdy "ears" calibrated for 100–1,200 yd (91–1,097 m) in 100 yd (91 m) increments. The bullet drop compensation is set by turning the range knob to the appropriate range setting. The bullet drop compensation/range knob can be adjusted by setting the rear sight elevation pinion. The elevation pinion can be fine adjusted in approximately one MOA increments. The aperture sight is also able to correct for wind drift operated by turning a windage knob that moves the sight in approximately one MOA increments. The windage lines on the receiver to indicate the windage setting are four MOA apart. The front sighting element consists of a wing-guard-protected front post.

During World War II the M1 rifle's semiautomatic operation gave United States infantrymen a significant advantage in firepower and shot-to-shot recovery time over enemy infantrymen armed primarily with bolt-action rifles. The semi-automatic operation and reduced recoil allowed soldiers to fire eight rounds as quickly as they could pull the trigger, without having to move their hands on the rifle and therefore disrupt their firing position and point of aim. The Garand's fire rate, in the hands of a trained soldier, averaged 40–50 accurate shots per minute at a range of 300 yards (270 m). "At ranges over 500 yards (460 m), a battlefield target is hard for the average rifleman to hit. Therefore, 500 yards (460 m) is considered the maximum effective range, even though the rifle is accurate at much greater ranges."

=== En bloc clip ===
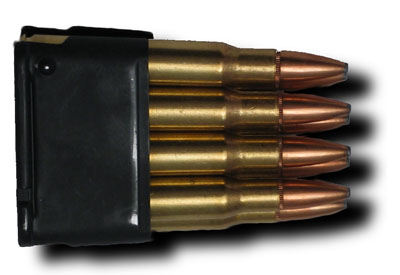
An M1 Garand en bloc clip loaded with eight .30-06 Springfield rounds

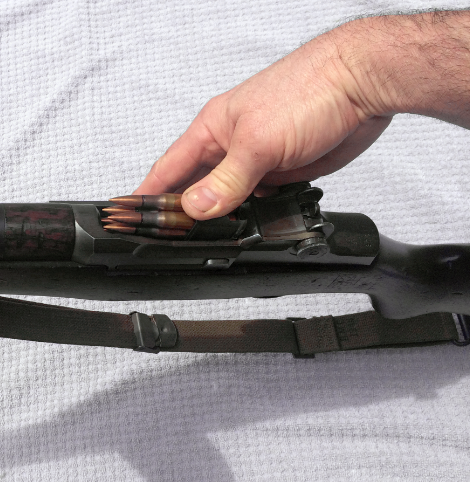
Loading the M1

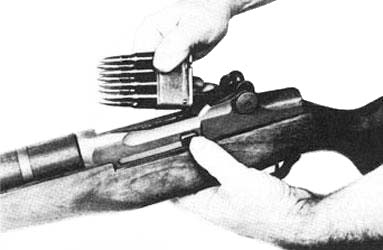
Unloading an M1 en bloc clip

The M1 rifle is fed by a reversible en bloc clip which holds eight rounds of .30-06 Springfield ammunition. When the last cartridge is fired, the rifle ejects the clip and locks the bolt open. The M1 is then ready to reload. Once the clip is inserted, the bolt snaps forward on its own as soon as thumb pressure is released from the top round of the clip, chambering a round and leaving it ready to fire.

Contrary to widespread misconception, partially expended or full clips can be easily ejected from the rifle by means of the clip latch button. It is also possible to load single cartridges into a partially loaded clip while the clip is still in the magazine, but this requires both hands and a bit of practice. In reality, this procedure was rarely performed in combat, as the danger of getting debris inside the action along with the cartridges increased the chances of malfunction. Instead, it was much easier and quicker to simply manually eject the clip, and insert a fresh one, which is how the rifle was originally designed to be operated. Later, special clips holding two (8+2=10 for target shooting) or five rounds (to meet hunting regulations) became available on the civilian market, as well as a single-loading device which stays in the rifle when the bolt locks back.

In battle, the manual of arms called for the rifle to be fired until empty, and then recharged quickly. Due to the well-developed logistical system of the U.S. military at the time, this consumption of ammunition was generally not critical, though this could change in the case of units that came under intense fire or were flanked or surrounded by enemy forces. When using the rifle to launch grenades, it requires the removal of a partially loaded clip of ball ammunition and replacement with a clip of M3 rifle grenade cartridges.

Officials in Army Ordnance circles demanded a fixed, non-protruding magazine for the new service rifle. At the time, it was believed that a detachable magazine on a general-issue service rifle would be easily lost by U.S. soldiers (a criticism made of British soldiers and the Lee–Enfield dozens of years previously), would render the weapon too susceptible to clogging from dirt and debris and that a protruding magazine would complicate existing manual-of-arms drills. As a result, inventor John Garand developed an en bloc clip system that allowed ammunition to be inserted from above, clip included, into the fixed magazine. While this design provided the requisite flush-mount magazine, the clip system increased the rifle's weight and complexity, and made only single loading ammunition possible without a clip.

Ejection of an empty clip created a distinctive metallic "ping" sound. In World War II, it was rumored that German and Japanese infantry were making use of this noise in combat to alert them to an empty M1 rifle in order to catch their American enemies with an unloaded rifle. It was reported that the U.S. Army's Aberdeen Proving Ground began experiments with clips made of various plastics in order to soften the sound, though no improved clips were ever adopted. Conversely, former German soldiers have said that the sound was inaudible during engagements and not particularly useful when heard, as other squad members might have been nearby ready to fire. Due to the often intense deafening noise of combat and gunfire it is highly unlikely any U.S. servicemen were killed as a result of being given away by the clang noise; however some soldiers still took the issue very seriously. Some U.S. veterans recalling combat in Europe are convinced that German soldiers did respond to the ejection clang, and would throw an empty clip down to simulate the sound so the enemy would expose themselves.

=== Gas system ===
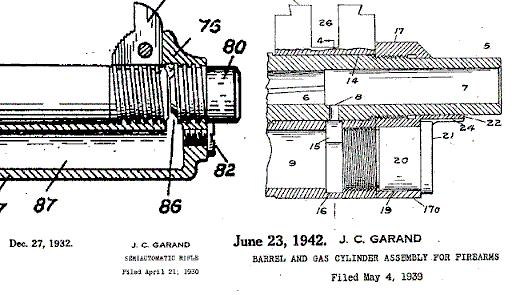
Two of Garand's patents, showing the original gas trap design and revised gas port system

Garand's original design for the M1 used a complicated gas system involving a special muzzle extension gas trap, later dropped in mid-1940 in favor of a simpler drilled gas port. Because most of the older rifles were retrofitted, pre-1940 gas-trap M1s are very rare today and are prized collector's items. In both systems, expanding gases from a fired cartridge are diverted into the gas cylinder. Here, the gases meet a long-stroke piston attached to the operating rod, which is pushed rearward by the force of this high-pressure gas. Then, the operating rod engages a rotating bolt inside the receiver. The bolt is locked into the receiver via two locking lugs, which rotate, unlock, and initiate the ejection of the spent cartridge and the reloading cycle when the rifle is discharged. The operating rod (and subsequently the bolt) then returns to its original position.

The M1 Garand was one of the first self-loading rifles to use stainless steel for its gas tube, in an effort to prevent corrosion. As the stainless metal could not be parkerized, the gas tubes were given a stove-blackening that frequently wore off in use. Unless the gas tube could be quickly repainted, the resultant gleaming muzzle could make the M1 Garand and its user more visible to the enemy in combat.

== Accessories ==
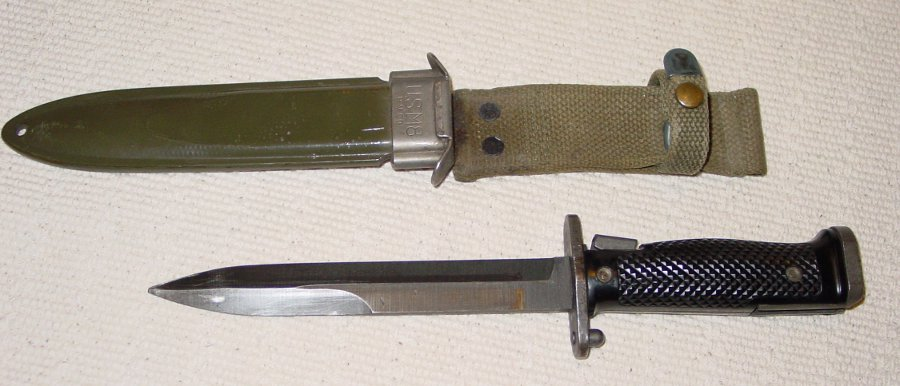
U.S. M5 bayonet with M8 scabbard

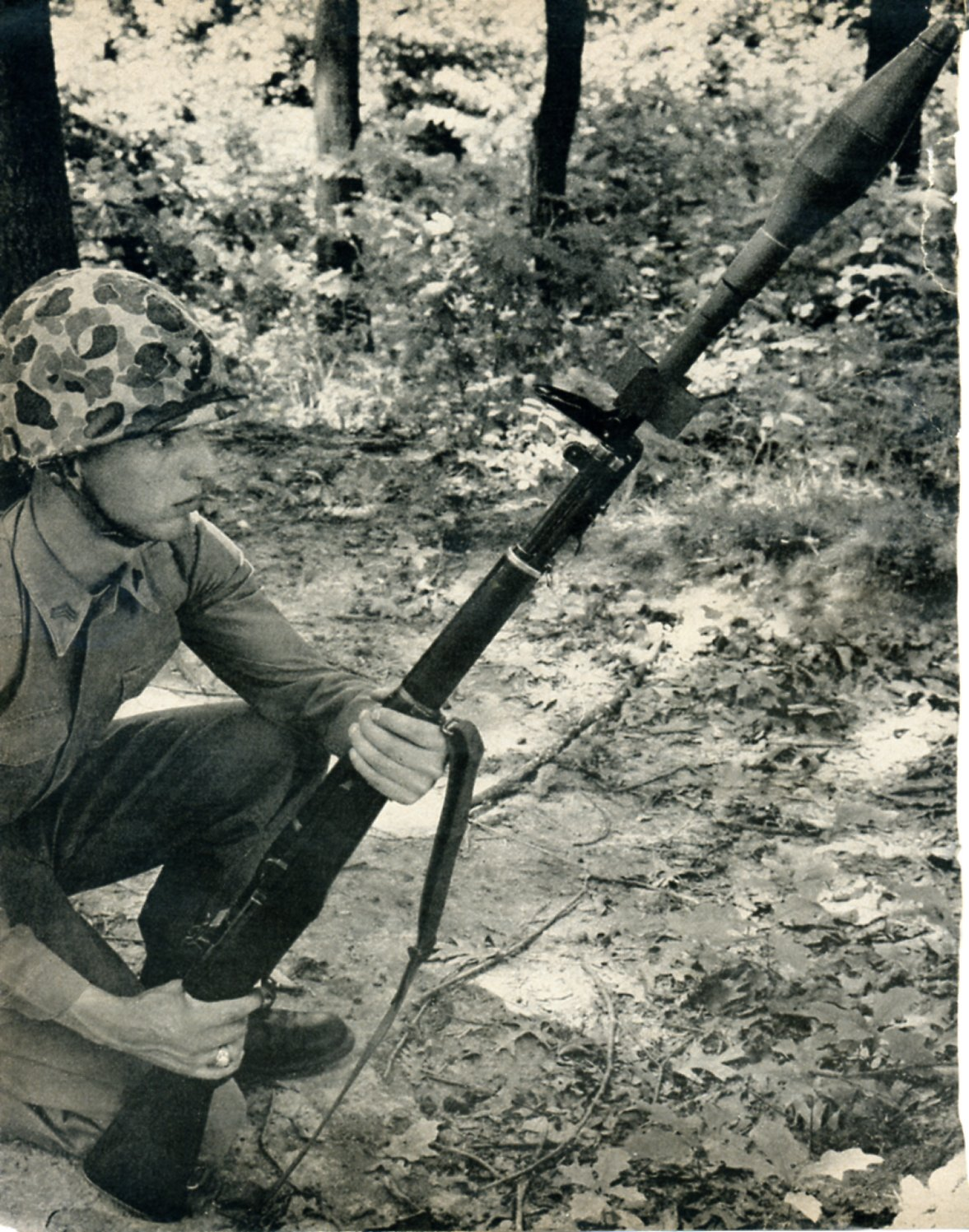
U.S. Marine preparing to fire M31 HEAT antitank rifle grenade from M1 rifle in the indirect mode with butt on the ground

Several accessories were used with the Garand rifle. Several different styles of bayonets fit the rifle: the M1905, with a 16-inch (406 mm) blade; the M1 with a 10-inch (254 mm) blade (either made standard or shortened from existing M1905 bayonets); and the M5 bayonet with a 6.75-inch (171 mm) blade.

Also available was the M7 grenade launcher that could easily be attached to the end of the barrel. It could be sighted using the M15 sight, which was attached with screws to the left side of the stock, just forward of the trigger.

A cleaning tool, oiler and grease containers could be stored in two cylindrical compartments in the buttstock for use in the field.

The M1907 two-piece leather rifle sling was the most common type of sling used with the weapon through World War II. In 1942, a cheaper and more adjustable olive drab canvas sling was introduced and gradually replaced the M1907 after the war.

Another accessory was the winter trigger, developed during the Korean War. It consisted of a small mechanism installed on the trigger guard, allowing the soldier to remotely pull the trigger by depressing a lever just behind the guard. This enabled the shooter to fire his weapon while using winter gloves, which may get caught on the trigger guard or not allow for proper movement of the finger.

== Variants ==
=== Sniper models ===
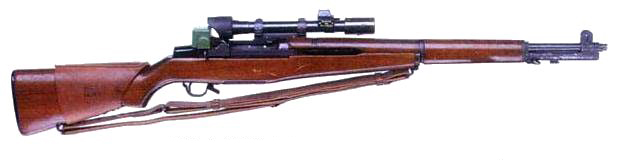
Rifle, Cal. 30, M1C with M84 telescope and rear sight protector

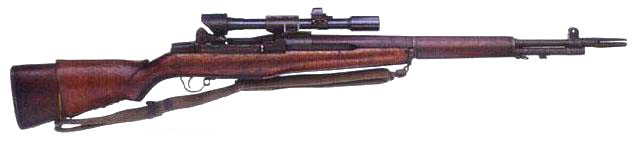
Rifle, Cal. 30, M1D with M84 telescope and T-37 flash suppressor

Most variants of the Garand, save the sniper variants, never saw active duty. The sniper versions were modified to accept scope mounts, and two versions (the M1C, formerly M1E7, and the M1D, formerly M1E8) were produced, although not in significant quantities during World War II. The only difference between the two versions is the mounting system for the telescopic sight. In June 1944, the M1C was adopted as a standard sniper rifle by the U.S. Army to supplement the venerable M1903A4, but few saw combat; wartime production was 7,971 M1Cs.

The procedure required to install the M1C-type mounts through drilling/tapping the hardened receiver reduced accuracy by warping the receiver. Improved methods to avoid reduction of accuracy were inefficient in terms of tooling and time. This resulted in the development of the M1D, which utilized a simpler, single-ring Springfield Armory mount attached to the barrel rather than the receiver. The M1C was first widely used during the Korean War. Korean War production was 4,796 M1Cs and 21,380 M1Ds; although few M1Ds were completed in time to see combat.

The U.S. Marine Corps adopted the M1C as their official sniper rifle in 1951. This USMC 1952 sniper's rifle, or MC52, was an M1C with the commercial Stith Bear Cub scope manufactured by the Kollmorgen Optical Company under the military designation: telescopic sight - Model 4XD-USMC. The Kollmorgen scope with a slightly modified Griffin & Howe mount was designated MC-1. The MC52 was also too late to see extensive combat in Korea, but it remained in Marine Corps inventories until replaced by bolt-action rifles during the Vietnam War.

A detachable M2 conical flash hider, adopted 25 January 1945 slipped over the muzzle and was secured in place by the bayonet lug. A T37 flash hider was developed later. Flash hiders were of limited utility during low-light conditions around dawn and dusk, but were often removed as potentially detrimental to accuracy.

=== Tanker models ===
The Tanker name was invented after the war as a marketing gimmick for commercial Garands built on welded demilled receivers. There are three 18-inch M1 Garand variants, the M1E5 and T26, which never saw service, and the Pacific Warfare Board rifle, which saw very limited service in the Pacific. The M1E5 is equipped with a shorter 18-inch (457 mm) barrel and a folding buttstock. The T26 also uses an 18-inch (457 mm) barrel but retains the standard buttstock. The PWB rifle uses an 18-inch (457 mm) barrel, retains the standard buttstock, and has a foregrip secured by M1903 barrel band.

A weapon with those features was potentially valuable for paratroopers, as it was more powerful than the carbines and submachine guns currently in use. Preliminary testing revealed it had excessive recoil and muzzle blast, and it was recommended that it be developed further. The Infantry Board directed Col. Rene Studler to proceed with the project.

The task was assigned to Springfield Armory, and John Garand began work in January 1944. The resultant experimental arm, designated as the "U.S. Carbine, Cal. 30, M1E5", was fitted with a specially made 18-inch barrel (not a shortened standard M1 rifle barrel) marked "1 SA 2-44" and a pantograph metal stock that folded underneath the rifle. The receiver was marked "U.S. Carbine/Cal. .30 M1E5/Springfield/Armory/1". It was designated as a carbine and not a rifle.

Other than the folding stock, the basic M1 rifle was essentially unchanged with the exception of the short barrel, a correspondingly shortened operating rod (and spring) and the lack of a front handguard. The overall length was 37½ inches and it weighed approximately 8 lbs., 6 ozs.

The M1E5 "Garand carbine" was tested at Aberdeen Proving Ground in May 1944. It was determined that while accuracy at 300 yards was on par with the standard M1 rifle, recoil, muzzle blast and flash were excessive. It was recommended that a pistol grip be installed, which was done for subsequent testing.

While the M1E5 was more compact than the standard Garand rifle, the short barrel made it an unpleasant gun to fire—and the advantages were not judged to be sufficient to offset the disadvantages. Further development of the M1E5 was suspended as other projects at Springfield, such as the selective-fire T20 series, were deemed to have a higher priority. Only one example of the M1E5 was fabricated for testing, and the gun resides today in the Springfield Armory National Historic Site Museum.

Despite the concept being shelved at Springfield Armory, the idea of a shortened M1 rifle was still viewed as potentially valuable for airborne and jungle combat use. Particularly in the Pacific Theater, there was widespread dissatisfaction with the M1 carbine's range, power and foliage-penetration ("brush-cutting") capability. The Ordnance Department was not responsive to these complaints coming in from the Pacific and maintained that the M1 rifle and M1 carbine each filled a specific niche.

Nonetheless, by late 1944, the Pacific Warfare Board (PWB) decided to move forward with the development of a shortened M1 rifle. Colonel William Alexander, chief of the PWB, directed an Army ordnance unit of the 6th Army in the Philippines to fabricate 150 rifles in this configuration for testing. Since the previous M1E5 project was not widely disseminated, it is entirely possible that the PWB may not have been aware of Springfield Armory's development of a similar rifle, and conceived the idea independently.

Some of the shortened M1 rifles were field-tested in October 1944 on Noemfoor Island, New Guinea, by an ad hoc test committee, which included three platoon leaders of the 503rd Parachute Infantry Regiment (PIR) combat team. While the members of the test committee liked the concept of the short M1 rifle, it was determined that the muzzle blast was excessive and was compared to a flash bulb going off in the darkened jungle. The conclusion of the test report stated that the shortened rifle was "totally unsuitable for a combat weapon".

Even while the shortened M1 rifles were being evaluated by the 503rd PIR, two of them were sent to the Ordnance Dept. in Washington, D.C., by special courier for evaluation. One of these rifles was then forwarded to Springfield Armory.

The M1s shortened in the Philippines under the auspices of the PWB had been well-used prior to modification, and the conversion exhibited rather crude craftsmanship, including hand-cut splines on the barrel.

Upon receipt of the PWB rifle, Springfield Armory's model shop fabricated a very similar shortened M1 that was designated as the "T26". One of the more noticeable differences was that the shortened PWB rifle had a cut-down front handguard (secured by an M1903 rifle barrel band), while the T26 rifle was not fitted with a front handguard. It had been determined that the full-length stock was superior to the M1E5's folding stock, so the T26 used a standard M1 rifle stock.

The PWB rifle, serial No. 2437139, and Springfield Armory's T26 were sent to Aberdeen Proving Ground (APG) on 26 July 1945, for testing. The APG report related that a standard M1 rifle, serial No. 1,032,921, was the "control" rifle to which the shorter rifle was compared during the testing. The results mirrored those of the M1E5's previous testing. The test report found that the modified rifle's muzzle flash, blast, and recoil were all significantly higher than that of the standard rifle. Additionally, it was less reliable, leading to it being declared "totally unsuitable as a combat weapon". Nonetheless, in July 1945, 15,000 short M1 rifles were requested for use by airborne troops. The rifles were supposed to be produced within the next five months, but the procurement was canceled due to the Surrender of Japan in August 1945.

Springfield Armory made 637,420 more M1 rifles from 1952 to 1957 and contracts were met with two private firms. Harrington & Richardson made 428,600 from 1953 to 1956 and International Harvester made 337,623 from 1953 to 1957. In total 5,468,772 M1 rifles were made from 1937 to 1957.

=== T20E2 ===
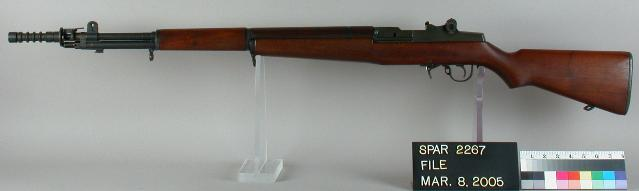
The T20E2 selective-fire prototype was designed to feed from 20-round BAR magazines.

Another variant that never saw duty was the T20E2. It was an experimental, gas-operated, selective fire rifle with a slightly longer receiver than the M1 and modified to accept 20-round Browning Automatic Rifle (BAR) magazines. The rifle was machined and tapped on the left side of the receiver for a scope mount, and included the same hardware for mounting a grenade launcher as the M1. The bolt had a hold-open device on the rear receiver bridge, as well as a fire selector similar to the M14. Fully-automatic firing was achieved by a connector assembly which was actuated by the operating rod handle. This, in turn, actuated a sear release or trip which, with the trigger held to the rear, disengaged the sear from the hammer lugs immediately after the bolt was locked. In automatic firing, the cyclic rate of fire was 700 rpm. When the connector assembly was disengaged, the rifle could only be fired semi-automatically and functioned in a manner similar to the M1 rifle. The T20 had an overall length of 48 1/4 inches (123 cm), a barrel length of 24 inches (61 cm), and weighed 9.61 pounds (4.36 kg) without accessories and 12.5 pounds (5.7 kg) with bipod and empty magazine. It was designated as limited procurement in May 1945. Due to the cessation of hostilities with Japan, the number for manufacture was reduced to 100. The project was terminated in March 1948.

=== Quick reference ===
U.S. Army designation	U.S. Navy designation	Description
T1	—	Prototype
T1E1	—	A single trial rifle that broke its bolt in the 1931 trial
T1E2	—	Trial designation for gas-trap Garand; T1E1 with a new bolt.
M1	—	Basic model. Identical to T1E2. Later change to gas port did not change designation
M1E1	—	M1 Garand variant; modified cam angle in op-rod
M1E2	—	M1 Garand variant; prismatic scope and mount
M1E3	—	M1 Garand variant; roller added to bolt's cam lug (later adapted for use in the M14)
M1E4	—	M1 Garand variant; gas cut-off and expansion system with piston integral to op-rod
M1E5	—	M1 Garand variant; 18-inch (457 mm) barrel, pistol grip and folding stock, for Airborne use
M1E6	—	M1 Garand variant; sniper variant
M1E7/M1C	—	M1E6 Garand variant; M1C sniper variant with 2.2× magnification M73 scope (later modified as the M81, though the M82 or M84 scope could be used) in a Griffin & Howe mount affixed to the left side of the receiver requiring a leather cheek pad to properly position the shooter's face behind the offset scope
M1E8/M1D	—	M1E7 Garand variant; M1D sniper variant with M82 scope (though the M84 scope could be used) in a Springfield Armory mount attached to the rear of the barrel allowing quick removal of the scope but similarly requiring the leather cheek pad
M1E9	—	M1 Garand variant; similar to M1E4, with piston separate from op-rod
M1E10	—	M1 Garand variant; variant with the Ljungman direct gas system
M1E11	—	M1 Garand variant; short-stroke Tappet gas system
M1E12	—	M1 Garand variant; gas port moved back approx. 6 inches
M1E13	—	M1 Garand variant; "White" gas cut-off and expansion system
M1E14	Mk 2 Mod 0	M1 Garand variant; rechambered in 7.62×51mm NATO with press-in chamber insert, enlarged gas port, and 7.62mm barrel bushing.
T20	—	M1 Garand variant; select-fire conversion by John Garand, capable of using BAR magazines
T20E1	—	T20 variant; uses its own type of magazines
T20E2	—	T20 variant; E2 magazines will work in BAR, but not the reverse
T20E2HB	—	T20E2 variant; HBAR (heavy barrel) variant
T22	—	M1 Garand variant; fully automatic select-fire conversion by Remington, magazine-fed
T22E1	—	T22 variant; improved magazine release and bolt hold-open device
T22E2	—	T22 variant; improved trigger group, gas cylinder, muzzle brake, and bipod
T22E3HB	—	T22 variant; stock angled upwards to reduce muzzle climb; heavy barrel; uses T27 fire control
T23	—	M1 Garand variant; upward angled stock like T22E3HB; standard clip fed.
T25	—	T25 variant had a pistol grip: the stock angled upwards to reduce muzzle climb; and chambered for the new T65 .30 Light Rifle cartridge (7.62×49mm).
T26	—	M1 Garand variant; 18-inch (457 mm) barrel and standard stock, 1 prototype made by Springfield Armory used for testing, proposed use was for airborne and jungle operations.
PWB rifle	—	M1 Garand variant; 18-inch (457 mm) barrel and standard stock and shortened foregrip secured with M1903 barrel band. 150 made in the Pacific theater of operations upon request by the Pacific War Board for airborne and jungle use.
T27	—	Remington select-fire field conversion for M1 Garand; ability to convert issue M1 Garands to select-fire rifles; fire control setup used in T22E3
T31	—	Experimental bullpup variant
T35	Mk 2 Mod 1	M1 Garand variant; rechambered for 7.62×51mm NATO; While the majority used the standard en bloc clip, a small number were experimentally fitted with a 10-round internal magazine loaded by 5-round stripper clips.
T36	—	T20E2 variant; rechambered for 7.62×51mm NATO using T35 barrel and T25 magazine
T37	—	T36 variant; same as T36, except in gas port location
T44	—	T44 variant; was a conventional design developed on a shoestring budget as an alternative to the T47. With only minimal funds available, the earliest T44 prototypes simply used T20E2 receivers fitted with magazine filler blocks and re-barreled for 7.62×51mm NATO, with the long operating rod/piston of the M1 replaced by the T47's gas cut-off system.
T47	—	T47 variant; same as the T25, except for a conventional stock and chambered for 7.62×51mm NATO.

=== Demilitarized versions ===
Demilitarized models are rendered permanently inoperable, unless proper techniques, tools, and replacement parts are used to restore the rifle to safe operation. Their barrels have been drilled out to destroy the rifling. A steel rod is then inserted into the barrel and welded at both ends. Sometimes, their barrels are also filled with molten lead or solder. Their gas ports or operating system are also welded closed. Their barrels are then welded to their receivers to prevent replacement. Their firing pin holes are welded closed on the bolt face. As a result, they cannot be loaded with, much less fire live ammunition. However, they may still be used for demonstration or instructional purposes.

Nomenclature	National Stock Number	Description
Rifle, Inert, Caliber .30, M1	1005-00-599-3289	Demilitarized and barrel plugged. US Air Force instructional use.
Rifle, Training Aid, Caliber .30, M1	1005-01-061-2456	Demilitarized and barrel plugged. Instructional use.
Rifle, Dummy Drill, Caliber .30, M1	1005-01-113-3767	Demilitarized. Barrel is unplugged but is welded to the receiver. ROTC instructional use.
Rifle, Ceremonial, Caliber .30, M1	1005-01-095-0085	Gas cylinder lock valve is removed and the gas system has welds permanently joining the lock and gas cylinder to prevent reversion. Barrel is unplugged but is welded to the receiver. The weapon has been converted from semi-automatic to a repeater and can only fire blanks. The bolt must be cycled to eject the spent cartridge case and reload a fresh round from the internal clip. Used by American Legion and Veterans of Foreign Wars honor guards for parading and firing ceremonial salutes.

=== United States of America ===
The U.S. Navy has also used the Garand, but rechambered for the popular at the time 7.62×51mm NATO round and calling it the M1 mod 0&1.The Mod 0 has a metal bushing and during testing was prone to fail and fall out. The Mod 1 was fit with a new barrel; and a piece of plastic to make sure the user didn't put the original 30-06 cartridge in the gun.

=== Pakistan ===
M1 Garands in Pakistan were found to be chambered in 7.92×57 mm due to a lack of .30-06 ammo in the country.

=== Philippines ===
Floro International formerly sold conversion kits that would modernized the M1 Garand in the Armed Forces of the Philippines to be chambered in 7.62 NATO ammo with 20-round magazines supplied.

== Copies and postwar derivatives ==
=== Japanese Type 4 ===
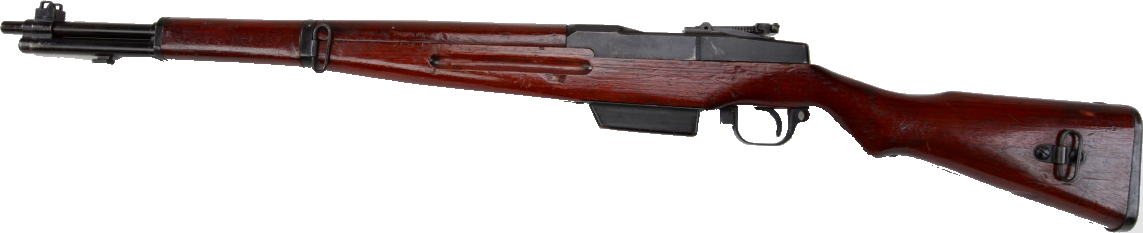
Japanese Type 4

The Type 4 Rifle, often referred to as the Type 5 Rifle (Japanese: 四式自動小銃 Yon-shiki jidousyoujyuu), was a Japanese prototype semi-automatic rifle. It was a copy of the American M1 Garand but with an integral 10-round magazine and chambered for the Japanese 7.7×58mm Arisaka cartridge. Where the Garand used an en bloc clip, the Type 4's integral magazine was charged with two 5-round stripper clips and the rifle also used Japanese style tangent sights. The Type 4 had been developed alongside several other prototypical semi-automatic rifles. However, none of the rifles entered into service before the end of World War II, with only 250 being made and many others were never assembled. There were several problems with jamming and feed systems, which also delayed its testing.

=== Beretta models ===
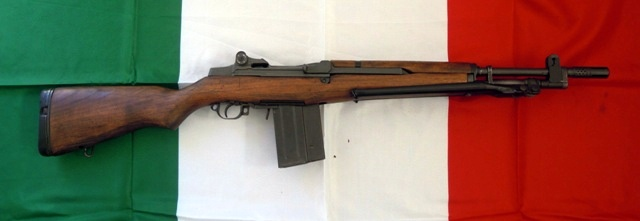
Beretta BM59

During the 1950s, Beretta produced Garands in Italy at the behest of NATO, by having the tooling used by Winchester during World War II shipped to them by the U.S. government. These rifles were designated "Model 1952" in Italy. Using this tooling, Beretta developed the BM59 series of rifles. The BM59 was essentially a rechambered 7.62×51mm NATO caliber M1 fitted with a removable 20-round magazine, folding bipod and a combined flash suppressor-rifle grenade launcher. The BM59 is capable of selective fire. These rifles were produced under license in Indonesia as the "SP-1" series.

=== M14 rifle ===
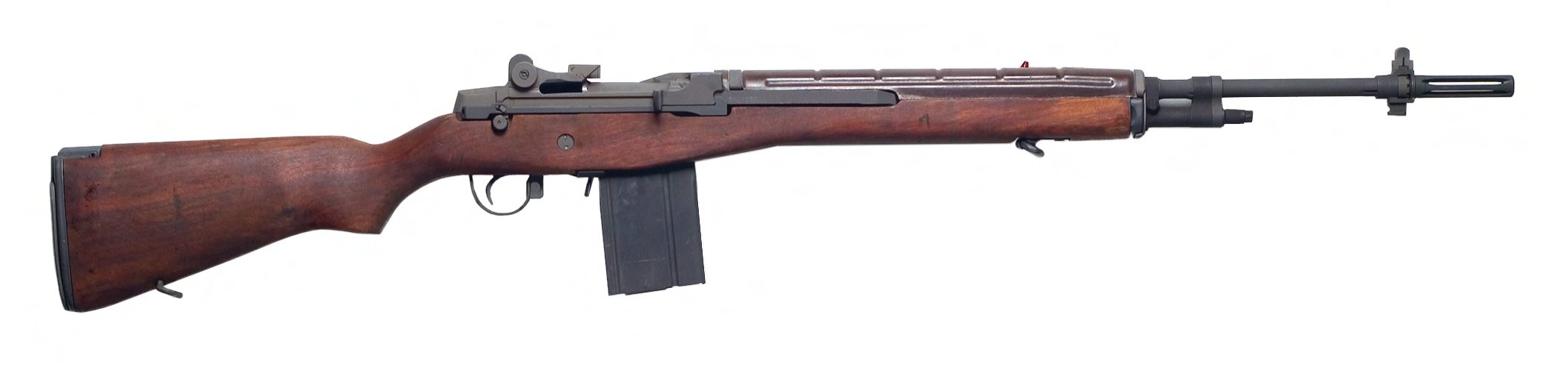
M14 rifle

The M14 rifle, officially the United States Rifle, 7.62 mm, M14, is an American selective fire automatic rifle that fires 7.62×51mm NATO (.308 Winchester) ammunition. The rifle is often described as an improved select-fire M1 Garand with a 20-round magazine.

=== Ruger Mini-14 ===
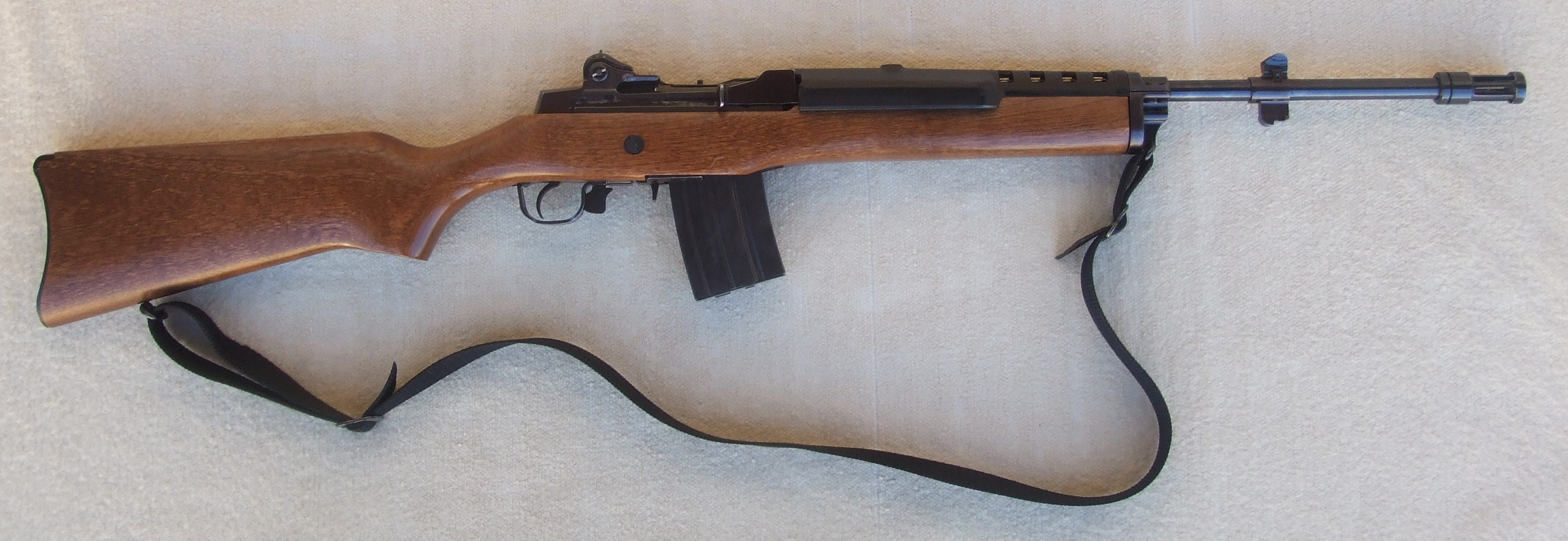
Ruger Mini-14GB

Designed by L. James Sullivan and William B. Ruger, and produced by Sturm, Ruger & Co. the Mini-14 rifle employs an investment cast, heat-treated receiver and a version of the M1/M14 rifle locking mechanism.

=== Springfield Armory commercial production ===
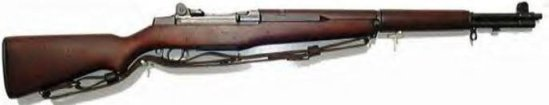
M1 Garand rifle

In 1982, years after the closure of the U.S. Springfield Armory in Springfield, MA, a commercial firm was created of the same name in Illinois– Springfield Armory, Inc. – began production of the M1 rifle using a cast, heat-treated receiver with serial numbers in the 7,000,000+ range, along with commercially produced barrels (marked Geneseo, IL) and G.I. military surplus parts.

== Civilian use ==
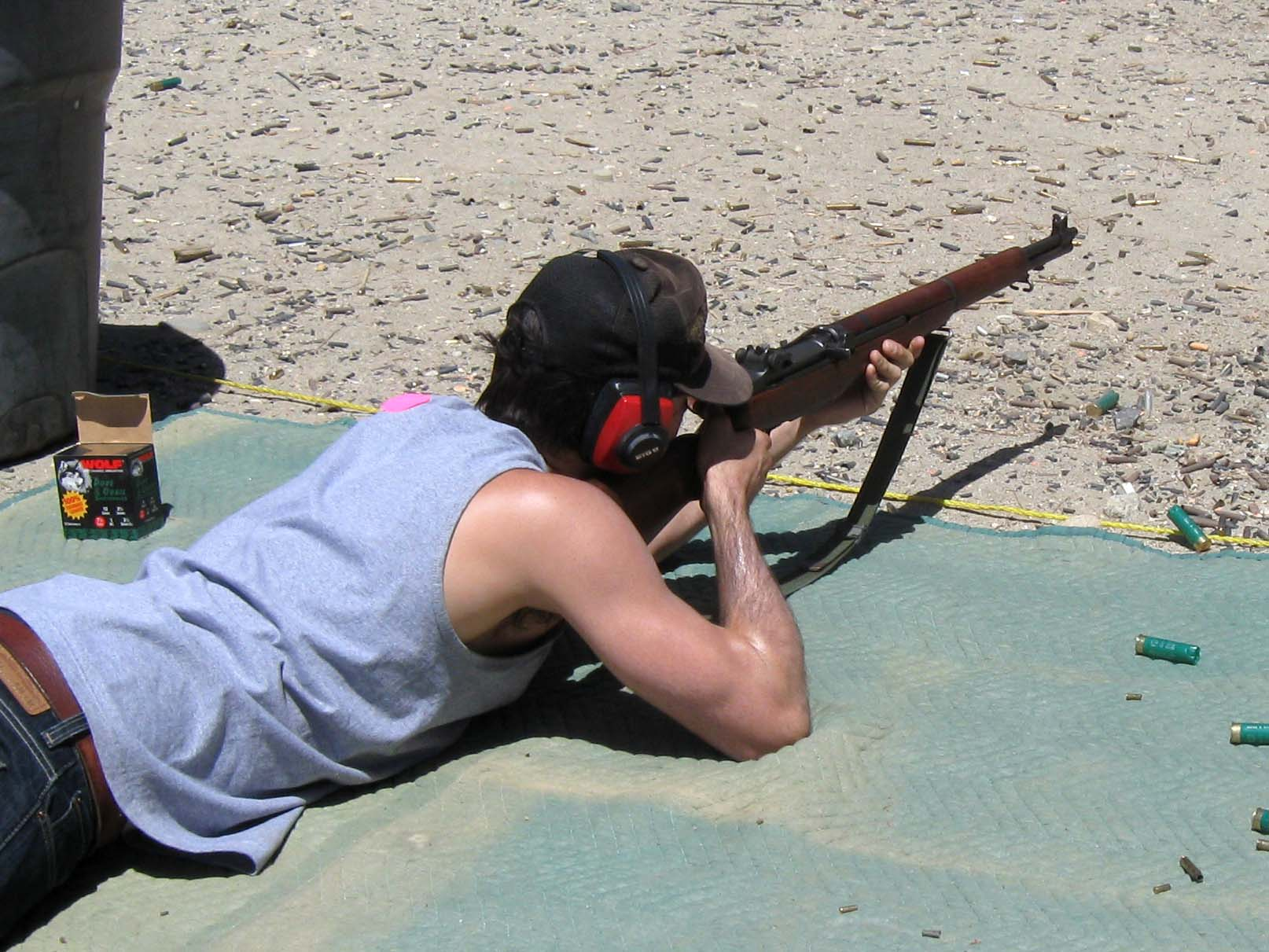
A civilian target shooting with an M1 Garand

The Civilian Marksmanship Program cartouche on an M1 Garand.

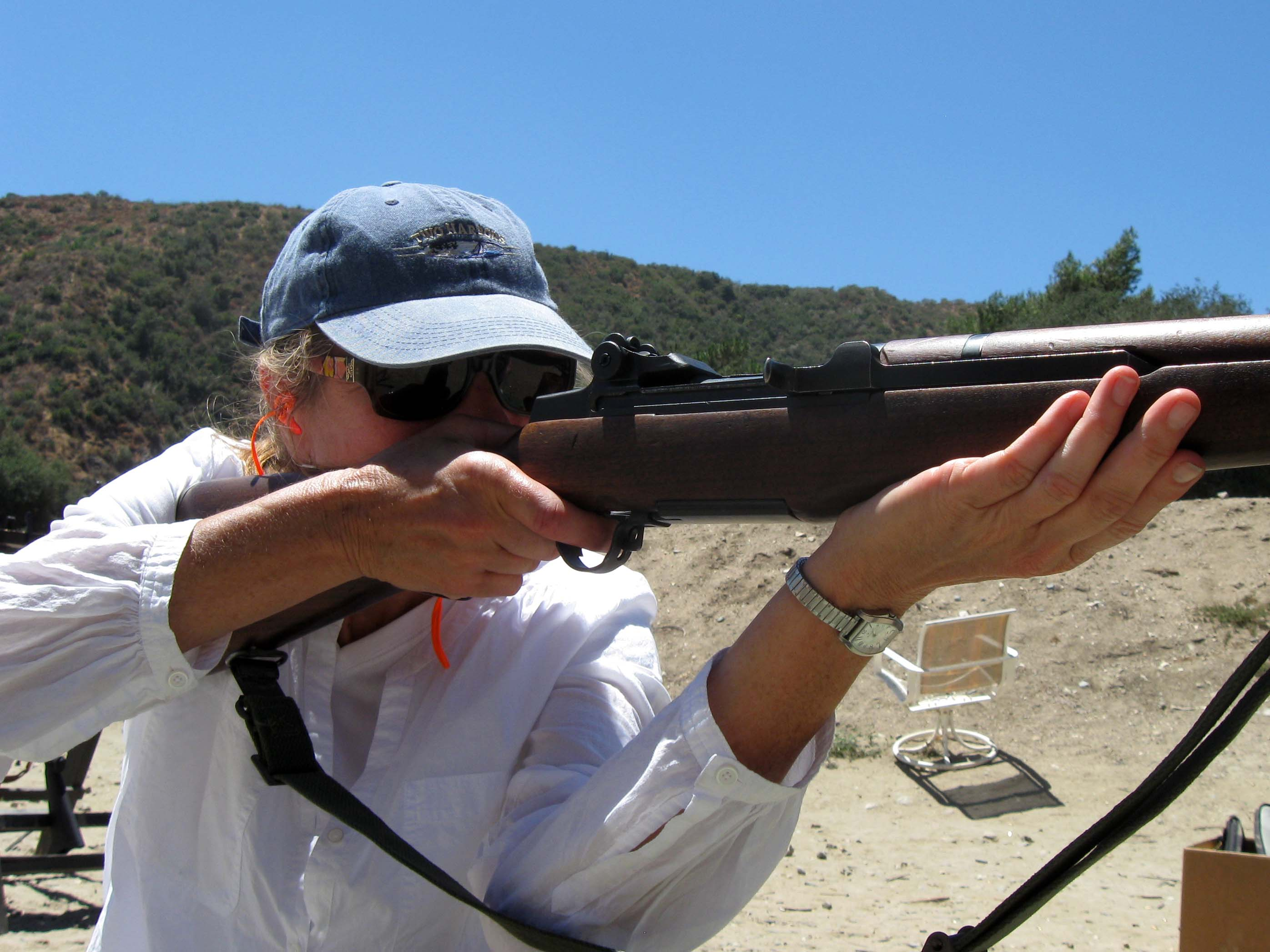
A woman target shooting with an M1 Garand

United States citizens meeting certain qualifications may purchase U.S. military surplus M1 rifles through the Civilian Marksmanship Program (CMP). The CMP is run by the Corporation for the Promotion of Rifle Practice and Firearms Safety (CPRPFS), a not-for-profit corporation chartered by the United States Congress in 1996 to instruct citizens in marksmanship and promote practice and safety in the use of firearms. The group holds a congressional charter under Title 36 of the United States Code. From 1903 to 1996, the CMP was sponsored by the Office of the Director of Civilian Marksmanship (DCM), a position first within the Department of War and later in the Department of the Army. The DCM was normally an active-duty Army colonel.

In 2009, an effort by the South Korean government to export about 850,000 firearms to the United States, including 87,000 M1 rifles, for eventual sale to civilians, was initially approved by the Obama administration, but it later blocked the sale in March 2010. A State Department spokesman said the administration's decision was based on concerns that the guns could fall into the wrong hands and be used for criminal activity. However, in January 2012, the U.S. and South Korea agreed on the sale of 87,000 M1 Garand rifles, and the South Korean government entered into discussion with U.S. civilian arms dealers. Korea has sold tens of thousands of M1 Garand rifles to the U.S. civilian market between 1986 and 1994. In 2018, the CMP reported they had received a shipment of more than 90,000 M1 Garand rifles from the Philippines and also stated plans to restore many of those rifles for civilian sale.

In August 2013, the Obama administration banned future private importation of all U.S. made weapons, including the M1 Garand. This action did not preclude the return of surplus U.S. weapons, including M1 Garands, previously loaned by the U.S. to friendly nations, to the custody of the U.S. Government; in recent years, the CMP has received most of its surplus weapons through such returns from foreign countries. However, all civilian and military firearms imported into the U.S. after 30 January 2002, are required by federal law to have the name of the importer conspicuously stamped on the barrel, slide, or receiver of each weapon. This requirement significantly lowers a military weapon's value relative to those without the importation markings as they distract from its original state.

Military surplus Garands and post-war copies made for the civilian market are popular among enthusiasts. In 2015, John F. Kennedy's personal M1 Garand was auctioned by Rock Island Auction Company and sold for $149,500. This rifle was acquired by Kennedy in 1959 from the Director of Civilian Marksmanship and has the serial number 6086970.

In May 2025, the CMP announced that it was working on a reproduction of the M1 Garand in cooperation with Heritage Arms USA.

== Users ==
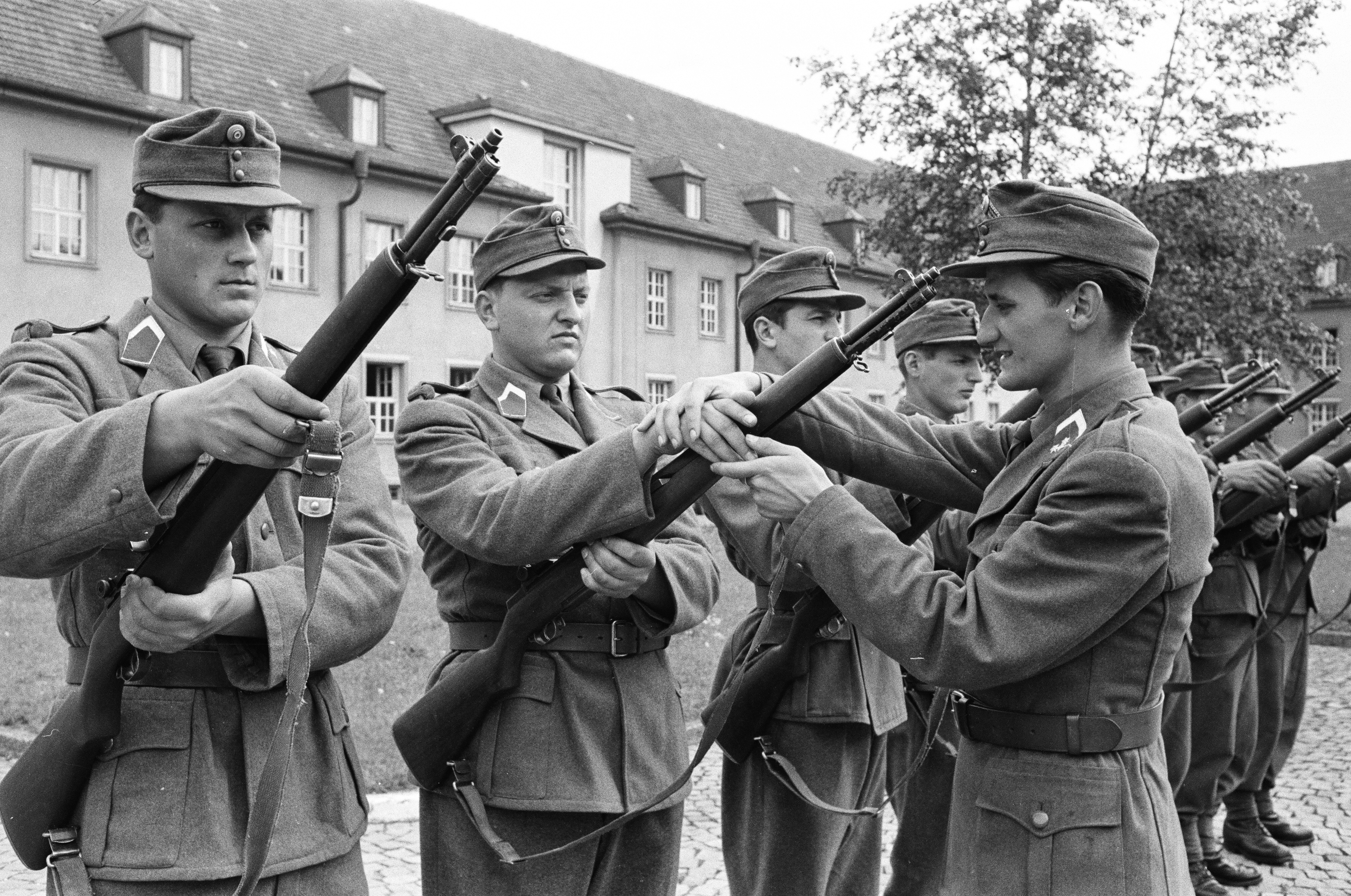
Austrian troops training with M1 Garands during the 1950s

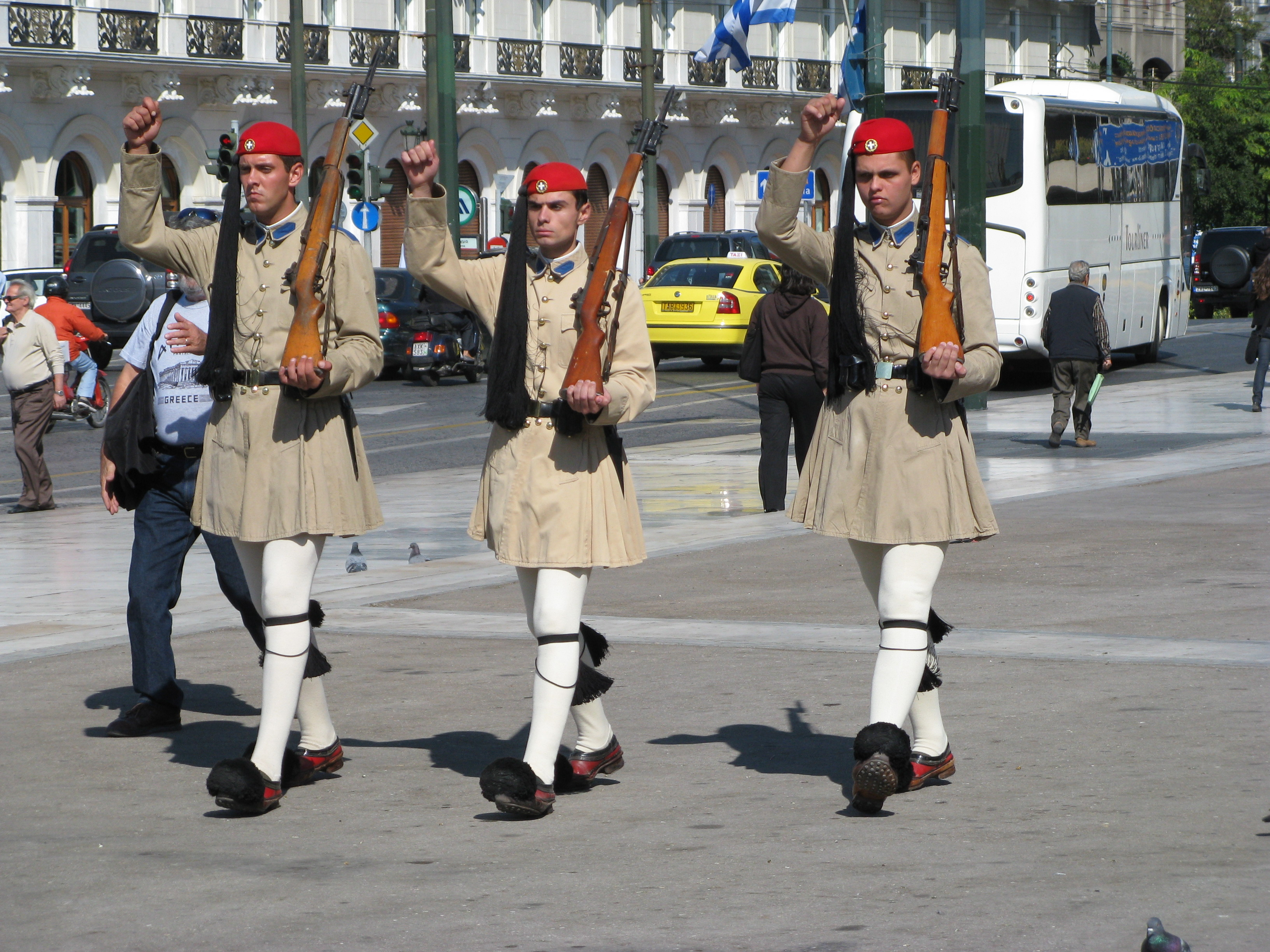
Evzones of the Presidential Guard in front of the Greek Parliament holding M1 Garands

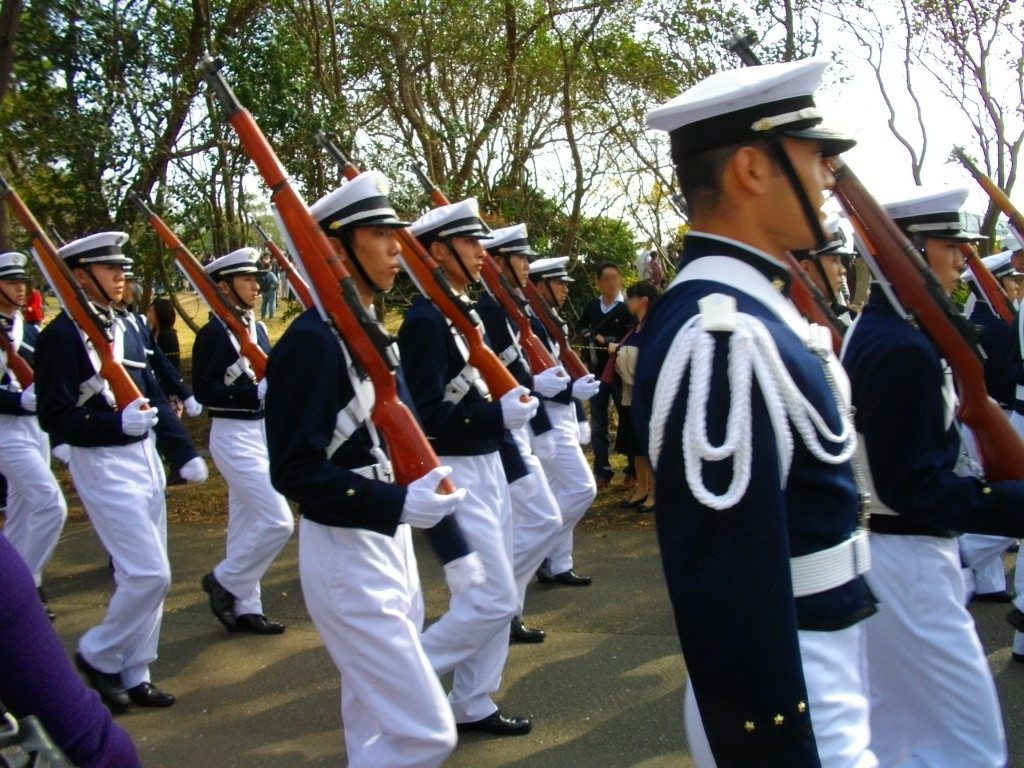
National Defense Academy of Japan Honor Guard Drill Team

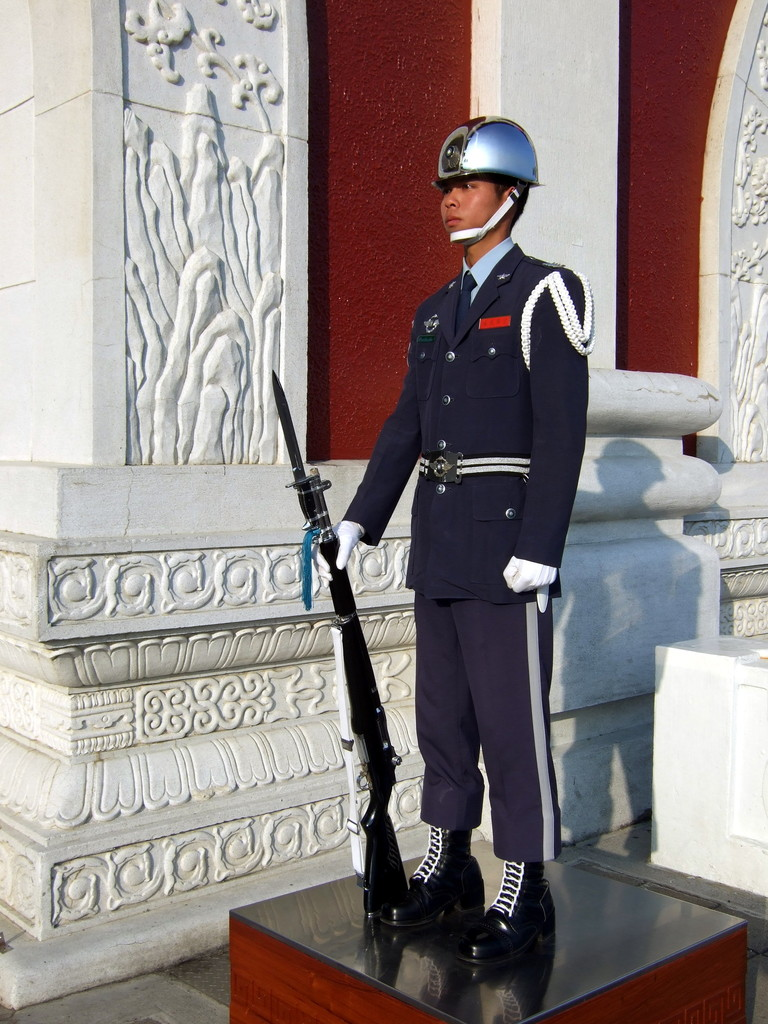
An ROC honor guard soldier and his M1 Garand

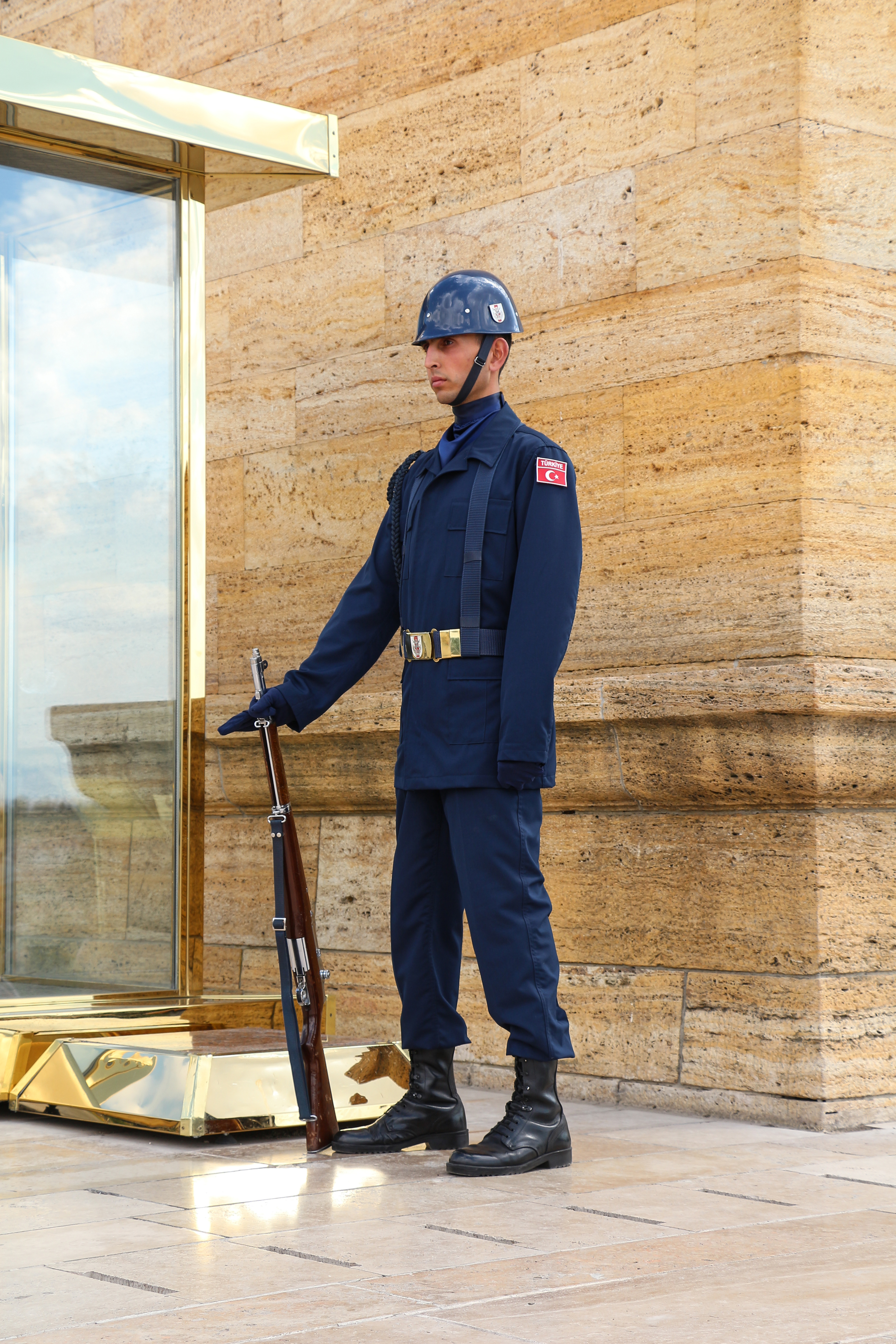
A Turkish soldier stands guard with his M1 rifle at the Anıtkabir Mausoleum

A map with ceremonial users of the M1 Garand in blue and former users in red

=== Current operators ===
==== Ceremonial uses only ====
- Belgium: Used as a ceremonial rifle by the Belgian Police.
- Greece: Received 186,090 M1 and 1880 M1C/M1D rifles from the U.S. government prior to 1975. Still in use for ceremonial duties by the Presidential Guard and the Honor Guard of the Ministry of National Defence.
- Haiti: Thousands were bought from various sources and received as aid from the U.S. Currently used for ceremonies and parades.
- Japan: Issued to the Japan Self-Defense Forces until the adoption of the Howa Type 64. Still used by the JSDF as a ceremonial weapon.
- Norway: Received 72,800 M1 rifles from the U.S. government prior to 1964. Used by the King's Guard ceremonially.
- Philippines: Received 34,300 M1 and 2,630 M1D rifles from the U.S. government in 1950–1975. Retired from active Philippine Marine Corps service. Irregularly used by units of the Citizen Armed Force Geographical Unit. Still used by honor guards. In 2017, it was reported that the Philippine government may send 86,000 rifles to the U.S. Civilian Marksmanship Program.
- South Korea: The first rifles were provided to the police in Southern Korea prior to 1947, then to the Korean Constabulary in February 1948. Between August 1948 and June 1949, 41,897 rifles were transferred to the Armed Forces from the United States. The military was equipped with 40,378 M1s before the Korean War. The U.S. provided additional 471,839 rifles during the war, and rifle in service with the Army reached 152,328 (December 1950), 189,704 (December 1951), 221,079 (December 1952), and 266,633 (27 July 1953) units. (Note: The servicing number does not include the Air Force, the Navy, or the police.) Also used during the Vietnam War until replacing to M16A1s started in 1967. Finally, the M1s were replaced by license produced M16A1s, and were removed from active service in 1978. Many rifles were sold back to the United States for civilian use: 100,000 rifles in 1986 to 1989 via Blue Sky, and 85,000 rifles in 1991 to 1993 via Century Arms. (Note: South Korea was the only nation that profited by reselling the M1 rifles, which were provided through Military Assistance Program (MAP), to private companies as "antique collectibles". These sales were authorized by the U.S. government, but were technically illegal under the laws.) Currently used for ceremonial duty.
- Taiwan: Aiding the Republic of China Armed Forces during the Cold War. Still used by the Armed Forces as a ceremonial weapon.
- Turkey: Received 312,430 M1 rifles from the U.S. government in 1953–1970, saw action in the Korean War and 1974 Cyprus War. Still used by the Turkish Armed Forces as a ceremonial weapon.
- United States: Standard issue rifle for U.S. Army and Marine Corps Infantry from 1936 to 1957. Used in the 1970s in reserve and rear-echelon capacities; superseded by the M16A1 in Army National Guard and Reserve component use starting in c. 1973. Still in use for official military ceremonies, ROTC units including JROTC Programs and Civil Air Patrol. Additionally, it remains the standard rifle of the United States Marine Corps Silent Drill Platoon.

=== Former operators ===
- Algeria
- Argentina: Received about 30,000 M1s from the U.S. government before 1964. Some were converted to accept Beretta BM 59 magazines in the 1960s.
- Austria: 25,000 M1 Garand rifles were supplied to Austria by the U.S. government after the end of World War 2. Used extensively by the Austrian Armed Forces until the adoption of the StG58.
- Brazil: Received large numbers of M1s from the U.S. government in the early 1950s. Some were converted to the 7.62×51mm NATO cartridge and modified to accept FN FAL magazines.
- Cambodia: Royal forces received M1 rifles from the U.S. during their civil war against communist insurgents.
- Canada: A small, but unknown, number of M1, M1C (with infra-red night vision equipment) and M1D rifles were owned by Canada. There were enough to equip a brigade and Garands were issued to certain Canadian Army units near the end of World War II and to some army and Royal Canadian Air Force personnel into the 1950s.
- Chile
- People's Republic of China Captured from Nationalist forces during the Chinese Civil War and US/ROK forces in the Korean War.
- Cuba: 10,000 ex-British M1s.
- Denmark: Received 69,810 M1 rifles (designated "Gevær m/50") from the U.S. government prior to 1964. Some were converted to the 7.62×51mm NATO cartridge. Also purchased 20,000 M1s from Italy. The rifle has now been phased out of service.
- El Salvador: Received more than 1,365 M1s from the U.S. government until 1965 and 211 M1D sniper rifles.
- Ethiopia: Received 20,700 M1 rifles from the U.S. government in the 1960s.
- France: Received 232,500 M1 rifles from the U.S. government in 1950–1964. The M1 was known as the Fusil semi-automatique 7 mm 62 (C. 30) M. 1 (Semi-automatic rifle 7.62 mm (calibre .30) M1)
- Germany: Captured from United States Army, limited use in World War II. German designation was Selbstladegewehr 7.62 mm 251 (a) (self-loading rifle 7.62 mm 251(a)).
- West Germany: Received 46,750 M1 rifles from the U.S. government prior to 1965.
- Honduras: Received from the US after the 1954 general strike.
- Indonesia: Received between 55,000 and 78,000 MS1s and a minor number of M1Cs from the U.S. government prior to 1971; some rifles also supplied from Italy.
- Iran: Received 165,490 M1 rifles from the U.S. government prior to 1964.
- Israel: Received up to 60,000 M1 rifles from the U.S. government prior to 1975.
- Italy: Used by the army from 1945. Beretta license-built 100,000 M1s from 1950 until the adoption of the BM59 in 1959. Also received 232,000 M1s from the U.S. government between 1950 and 1970. The M1 Garand was known in the Italian Army as the Fucile «Garand» M1 cal. 7,62.
- Ivory Coast
- Empire of Japan: Captured from American troops and eventually reversed-engineered as the Type 4 rifle.
- Jordan: Received an estimated 25,000–30,000 M1 rifles from the U.S. government prior to 1974.
- Laos: Received 36,270 M1 rifles from the U.S. government in 1950–1975.
- Liberia
- Netherlands: known as Geweer Garand 7,62mm in the Royal Netherlands Army and Geweer v/7,62 mm no. 2 S/aut in the Royal Netherlands Navy.
- Nicaragua: Received 5000 M1s from the US 1954. MAP bought 1500 M1 from Canada.
- Pakistan: Received possibly 150,000 M1 rifles from the U.S. government prior to 1975.
- Panama
- Paraguay: Received 30,750 M1 rifles from the U.S. government prior to 1975.
- Saudi Arabia: Received 34,530 M1 rifles from the U.S. government prior to 1975.
- Taliban: Used during the War in Afghanistan by Taliban insurgents.
- Thailand: Received about 40,000 M1 rifles from the U.S. government prior to 1965. Designated ปลยบ.88 (Type 88 Self-Loading rifle).
- United Kingdom: Received 38,000 via Lend-Lease.
- Uruguay
- Venezuela: Received 55,670 M1 rifles from the U.S. government prior to 1975.
- North Vietnam and Vietnam: Largely captured and/or inherited from now-defunct Army of the Republic of Vietnam. Some used by the Viet Cong and the Viet Minh, taken from American, French and South Vietnamese forces/armories with a few modified to make them compact.
- South Vietnam: Received 220,300 M1 and 520 M1C/M1D rifles from the U.S. government in 1950–1975.

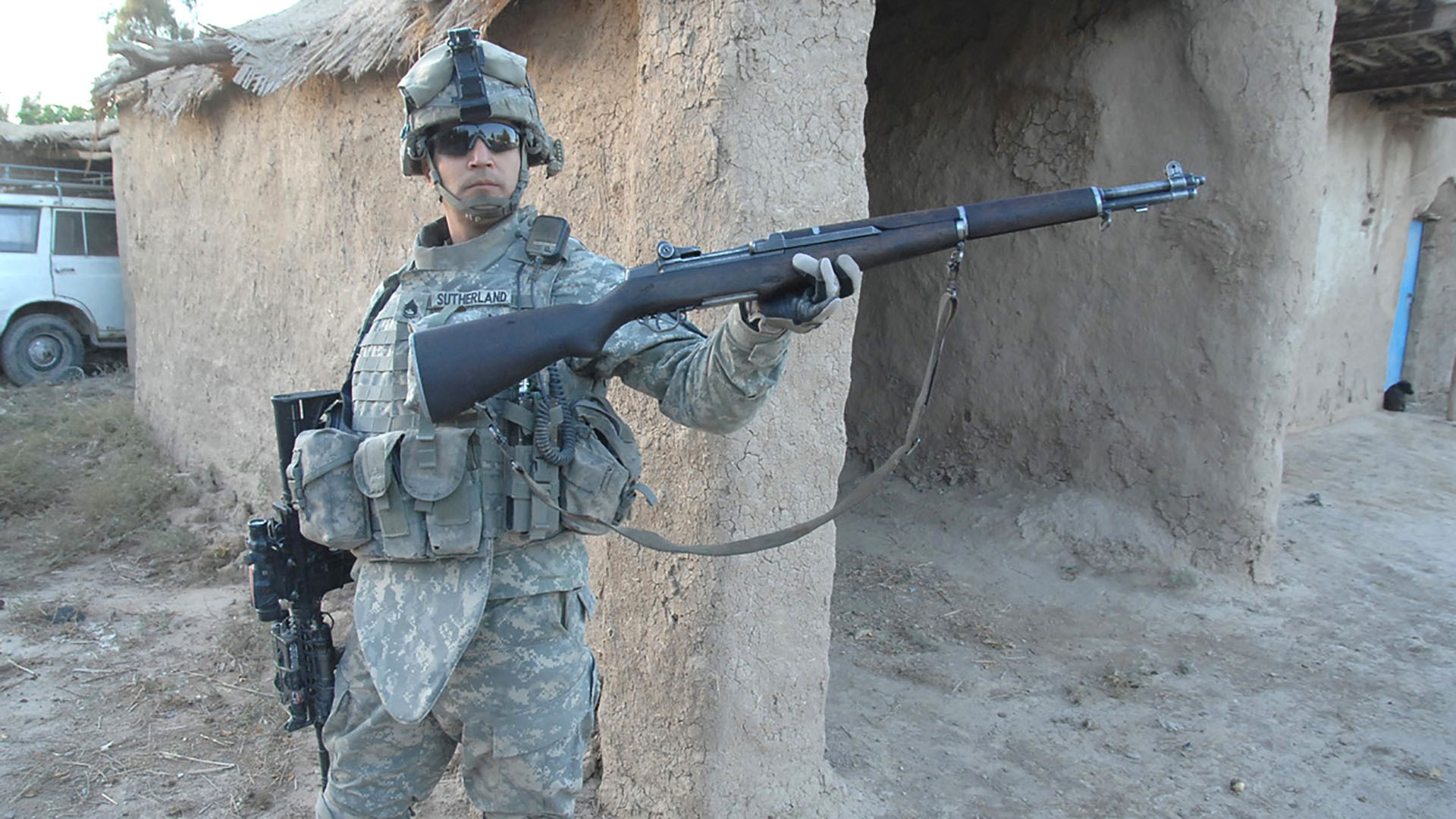
A U.S. infantryman holding an M1 captured in Iraq, 2007

=== Non-state actors ===
- Iraqi insurgents
- Moro National Liberation Front: Used by MNLF fighters.
- New People's Army
- Provisional Irish Republican Army

== See also ==
- Gewehr 43
- Howell automatic rifle
- List of U.S. Army weapons by supply catalog designation SNL B-21
- Remington Model 8
- SVT-40
- Table of handgun and rifle cartridges

Preceded by M1903 Springfield	United States Army rifle 1936–1958	Succeeded by M14 rifle
