= History of Abercrombie & Fitch =

The Founders of Abercrombie & Fitch

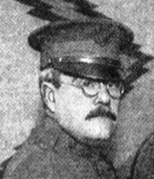
David T. Abercrombie

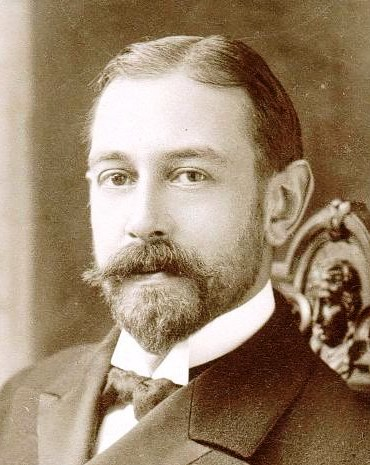
Ezra Fitch

The history of Abercrombie & Fitch began in the 19th century and extends into the 21st century. Key figures who changed and influenced the course of Abercrombie & Fitch's history include co-founders David T. Abercrombie and Ezra Fitch, Limited Brands and Michael Jeffries, the former chairman and CEO.

David Abercrombie founded A&F in 1892 as an upscale sporting goods store. Forming a partnership with Ezra Fitch, the company continued to expand in the new 20th century. After Abercrombie left the company, Fitch became sole owner and ushered in the "Fitch Years" of continued success. Shortly after his retirement, the company continued to develop under a succession of other leaders until its financial fall and closing in 1977. Limited Brands purchased the ailing brand in 1988 and brought in Mike Jeffries, who revolutionized the image of Abercrombie & Fitch to become an upscale youthful fashion retailer.

== Founding ==
The company was originally established as Abercrombie Co. by David Abercrombie on June 4, 1892, in a small waterfront shop at 36 South Street in downtown Manhattan, New York. Wealthy New York businessman Ezra Fitch became one of the store's regular customers. In 1900, Fitch bought a major share in the growing Abercrombie Company and thus joined as co-founder.

The partnership between Abercrombie and Fitch did not end happily. The two men, with different visions for the future of A&F, quarreled frequently, although the company continued to prosper. Fitch wished to expand the company's appeal to the general public, while Abercrombie wanted to continue selling professional gear to professional outdoorsmen. As a result of the disagreement, Abercrombie sold his share in the company to Fitch in 1907 and returned to manufacturing outdoor goods. Fitch continued the business with other partners and directed the company as he pleased.

== The Fitch years ==
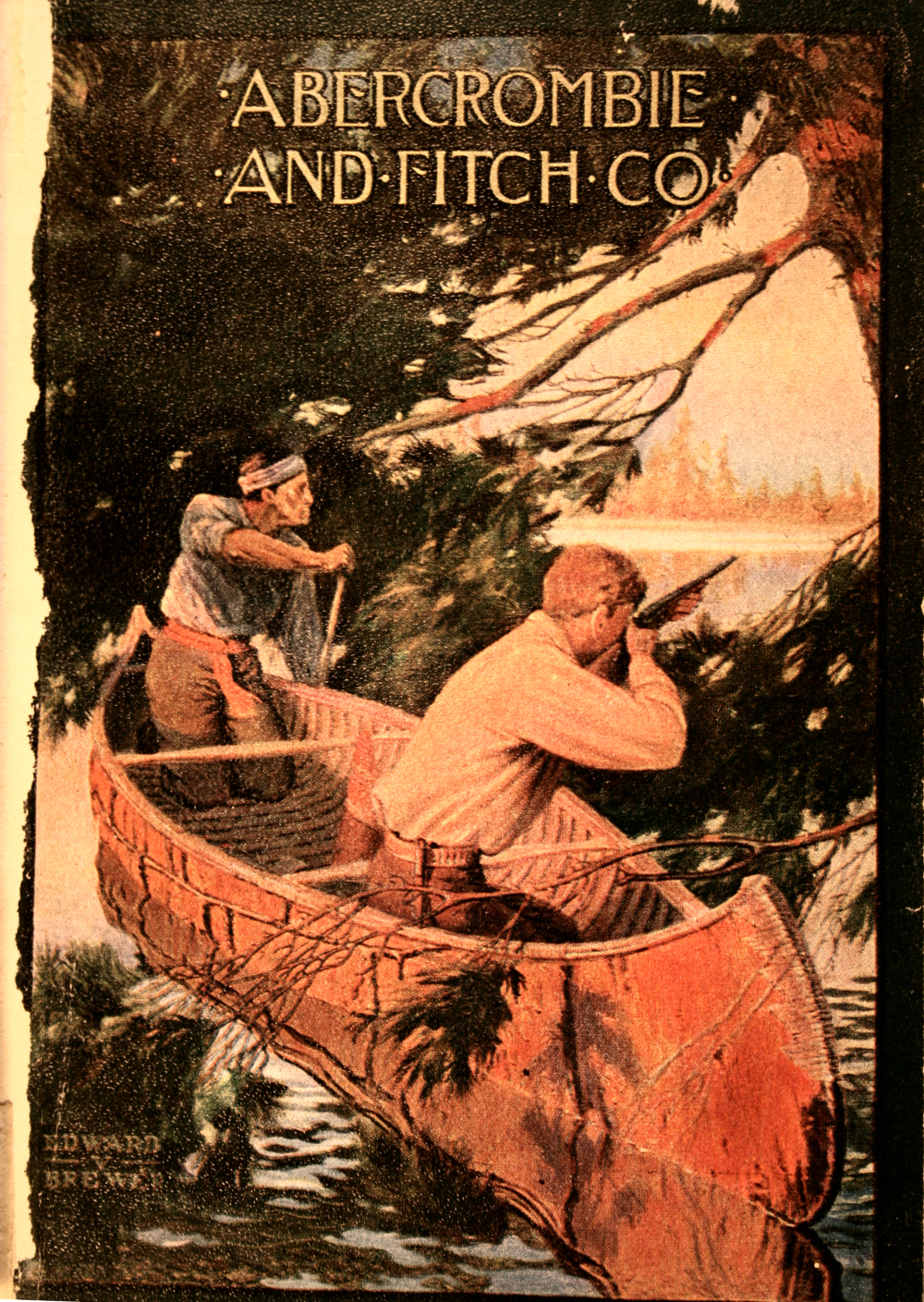
Cover of A&F catalog from 1909

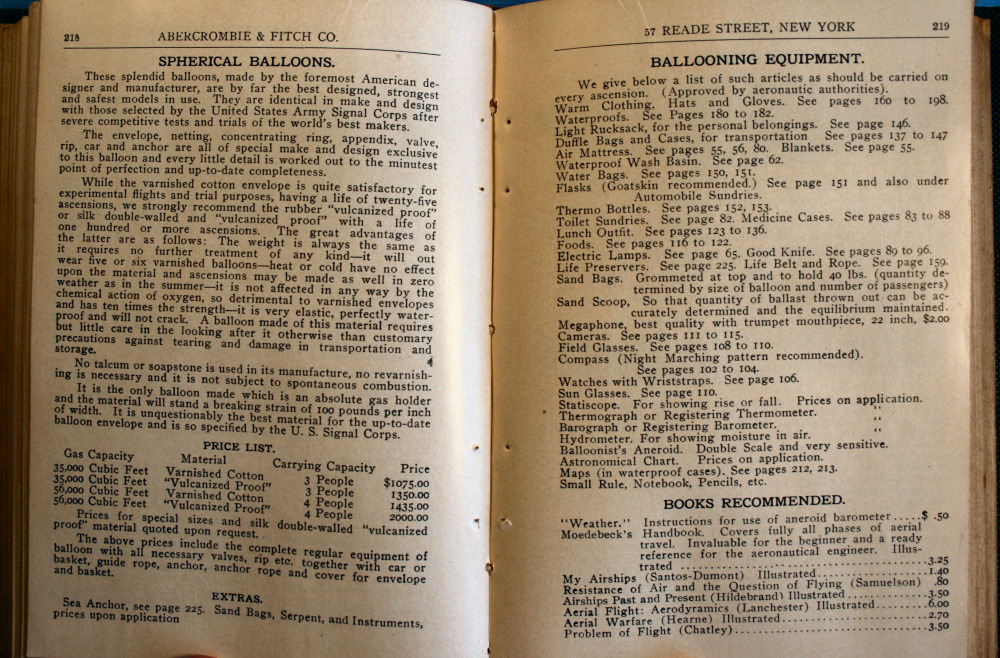
Inside the 1909 catalog

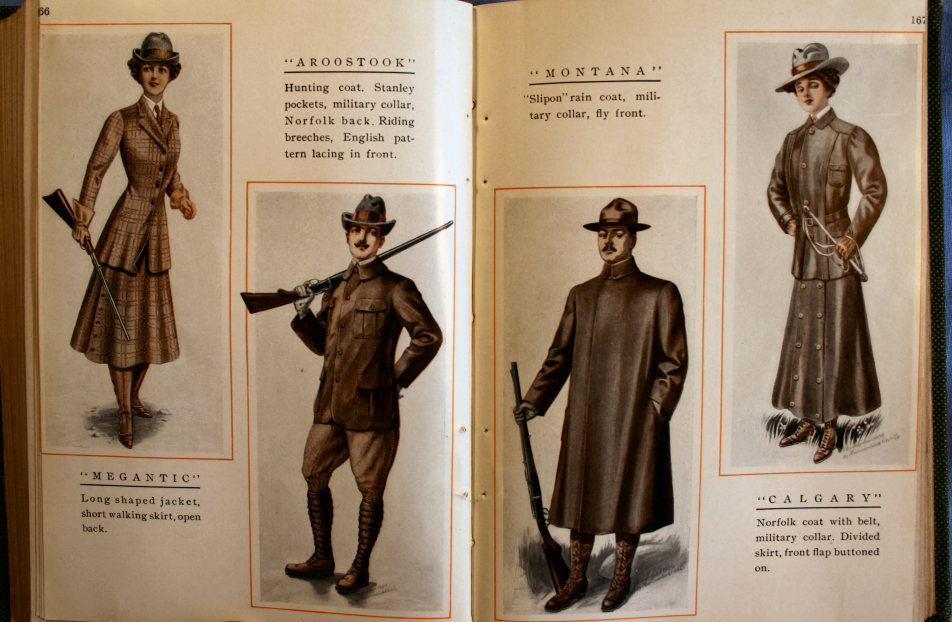
Inside the historical A&F 1909 catalog

In 1909, Abercrombie & Fitch Co. mailed over 50,000 copies of its 456-page catalog worldwide (a staggering and costly amount of publication at that time, since each cost a dollar to produce). The catalog featured outdoor clothing, camping gear, articles, and advice columns. The cost of the catalog nearly bankrupted the company, but the catalog proved to be a profitable marketing device. Within the store, the catalog was available to customers for free. By 1910, the company began selling women's clothing, and became the first store in New York to supply clothing to women as well as men. In 1913, after moving into Reade Street, which was not a convenient shopping location for women, the store relocated to a more fashionable and easily accessible midtown address near Fifth Avenue at 55/57 West 36th Street, expanding its inventory to include sportswear. In 1917, the store moved again into a 12-story building at the corner of Madison Avenue and East 45th Street. The store occupied the entire available space (12 stories).

The Madison Avenue store included many different amenities. The basement housed a shooting range while on the mezzanine (main floor) paraphernalia for skiing, archery, free diving, and lawn games were sold. The second through fifth floors were reserved for clothing that was suitable for different climate or terrains. On the sixth floor were a picture gallery, a bookstore (focused on sporting themes), a watch repair facility and a golf school (fully equipped with a resident professional). The seventh floor included a gun room with hundreds of shotguns and rifles, decorated with stuffed game heads, as well as a kennel for dogs and cats. The eighth floor contained fishing, camping, and boating equipment and included a desk for a fly- and bait-casting instructor who gave lessons at the pool, which was located on the roof. The fishing section alone was stocked with over 48,000 flies and over 18,000 fishing lures.

Abercrombie & Fitch Co. became the first American store to import Mahjong. Ezra Fitch imported the game after a female customer looked for the game that she had played in China. He went to China for the game and translated the instructions into English. Mahjong became a fast selling product, and Abercrombie & Fitch became the epicenter of the Mahjong craze. The company sent emissaries to Chinese villages to buy as many Mahjong sets as possible and eventually sold over 12,000 sets.

In 1927, Abercrombie & Fitch outfitted Charles Lindbergh for his historic flight across the Atlantic Ocean. It also attracted the business of other prominent figures.

== Post-Fitch era ==
In 1928, Fitch retired from the company and sold to his brother-in-law, James S. Cobb. Under Cobb, A&F acquired Von Lengerke & Detmold, a well-respected New York dealer of fine European-made sporting guns and fishing tackle, as well as that company's Chicago branch, Von Lengerke & Antoine. Cobb also acquired Griffin & Howe, another gunsmith company. Merchandise from both Von Lengerke & Detmold and Griffin & Howe was carried at A&F's Madison Avenue store. By this time, A&F was also selling equipment for polo, golf, and tennis. By 1929, sales of US$6.3 million were reported with net profits of US$548,000.

During the Great Depression, the company's revenue decreased and it stopped paying dividends. Sales plunged to $2,598,925 in 1933. A&F recovered in the following years and resumed paying dividends in 1938. During that year, guns accounted for 40% of sales at the Madison Avenue store. Clothing, shoes, and furnishings accounted for 45%, while inventory was valued at about 40% of annual sales (reflecting A&F's readiness to meet customer demands). Ten percent of the business was attributed to mail orders from the catalog. Abercrombie & Fitch Co. continued to expand. As early as 1913, A&F had adopted the slogan, "The Greatest Sporting Goods Store in the World".

A&F's record net profit was $682,894 in 1947. The company opened a large branch in San Francisco in 1958. It soon added small winter-only shops open from November through May each season in Palm Beach and Sarasota, Florida, and summer-only shops in Bay Head, New Jersey, and Southampton, New York. to complement a shop in Hyannis, Massachusetts, it had operated since the end of World War II. Otis Guernsey succeeded Cobb as president. He remarked, "The Abercrombie & Fitch type does not care about the cost; he wants the finest quality." With so many locations now under the control of Abercrombie & Fitch, the Madison Avenue store remained the flagship store. In the 1950s, the main floor of the flagship was remodeled to include heads of buffalo, caribou, moose, elk, and other big game, stuffed fish of spectacular size, and elephant's-foot wastebaskets.

In 1960, net sales rose to $16.5 million, but net profit fell for the fourth straight year to $185,649. By 1961, net sales dropped to $15.5 million, and net profit to $124,097. Guernsey's successor as president, John H. Ewing, paid little attention to the decline in sales. In 1961, he told an interviewer of Business Week that Abercrombie & Fitch enjoyed a special niche "by sticking to our knitting; by not trying to be all things to all people." A&F would open a year-round resort shop at The Broadmoor resort in Colorado Springs (1962) and its first suburban store at the Mall in Short Hills, New Jersey (1963). Under the leadership of Earle K. Angstadt Jr., Abercrombie's continued to expand in upscale locations such as the Bal Harbour Shops near Miami Beach, Florida (1966), the Somerset Mall in Troy, Michigan, outside Detroit (1969) and in boutique-style shops in other department stores.

In 1964, Abercrombie and Fitch achieved a notable early example of the "brand integration" form of product placement by providing the venue for part of the Rock Hudson / Paula Prentiss romantic comedy film Man's Favorite Sport?.

Abercrombie and Fitch held a warehouse sale in 1968 and early 1970 and presented offbeat newspaper advertisements that reflected a measure of desperation. The company's revenue continued decline, with a loss of about $500,000 in its previous fiscal year. Noticing the effect that the ads and sale-days had upon the Abercrombie & Fitch customer base, the next president William Humphreys, a former Lord & Taylor executive, halted the measures. He focused on improving A&F's inventory control and credit practices and cutting the company's expenses.; changed the store design to present a different image, focused on expansion into the suburbs in 1972 with a location in Oak Brook, Illinois, 1972 in hopes of recapturing customers who no longer patronized its store in downtown Chicago's Loop. Noticing that the offbeat advertisements were bringing in customers that management considered "not of classic Abercrombie & Fitch material," A&F ceased its mis-directing ads and sale-days in October 1970. Presentation within the flagship changed as well to provide a newer look. Expensive sailboats were moved from the main floor to an upper floor, a discount clothing section was introduced on the tenth floor, sportswear lines were expanded, and new buyers for woman's apparel were hired. However, the changes did not improve sales and the company continued to decline financially under Humphreys and his successor Hal Haskell, who was a major stockholder of the company. After losing $1 million in 1975, Abercrombie & Fitch Co. filed for chapter 11 bankruptcy in August 1976 and finally closed its doors in November 1977.

Oshman's, a sporting goods retailer, acquired Abercrombie & Fitch Co. in 1978 for $1.5 million ($5.2 million in 2013 dollars). It opened an Abercrombie & Fitch store in 1979 in Beverly Hills, California, and another in Dallas, Texas, which was bigger and sported US$40,000 elephant guns and an "Abercrombie Runabout sports convertible" worth US$20,775. Stores continued to open in South Street Seaport and Trump Tower and catered towards contemporary interests of golf, exercise, and tennis. Clothing collections for men and women carried business and casual dress, and sportswear. Forbes described the merchandise as "a hodgepodge of unrelated items" and that "sometimes it is better to bury the dead than to try reviving them." Abercrombie & Fitch continued to struggle as Oshman's struggled itself to develop a strong identity for the company.

== Modern image ==
=== 1988 through 1999: rebranding into fashion retail ===
In 1988, Limited Brands acquired the ailing company for $47 million after having success in popularizing Express and Victoria's Secret. Headquarters was moved to Columbus, Ohio, and all inventory was cleared out. The new president of Abercrombie & Fitch, Sally Frame-Kasaks, placed a strong emphasis on apparel. Michael S. Jeffries, a clothing executive, took over as president in 1992. He popularized the brand to a teen apparel merchandiser from an ailing sports brand. He believed that focusing the A&F brand towards the American teen market would be financially beneficial as that sector of retail economy was said to be growing at a record rate at the time.

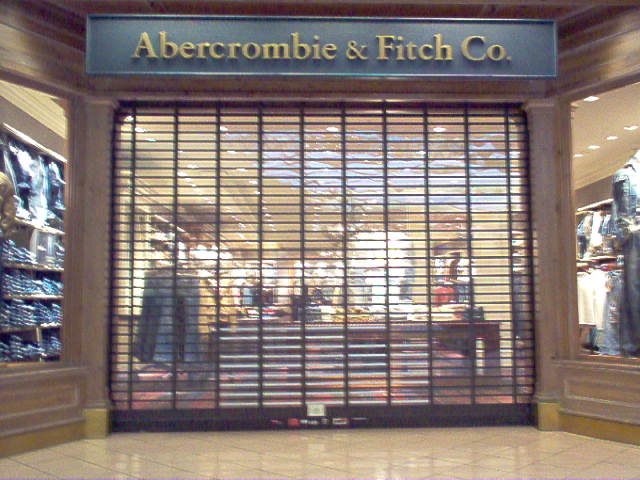
The Chain store prototype (front)

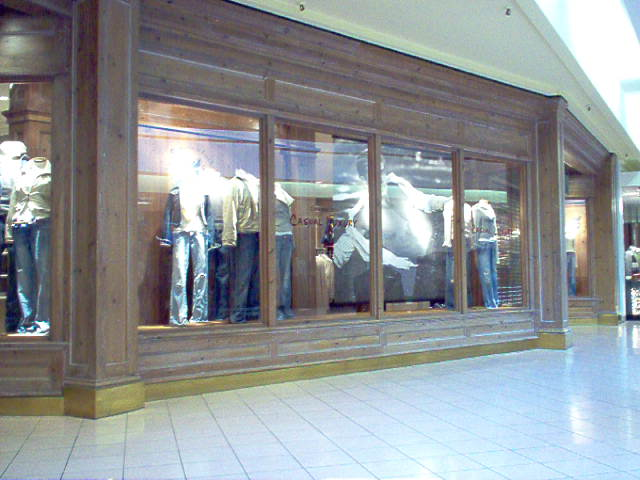
Side view

The new Abercrombie & Fitch reopened shortly afterwards with a preppy outdoors theme reminiscent of the company's original roots. Jeffries commissioned Bruce Weber—known for his sexual beefcake photography—as the chief photographer defining the ad campaigns for the brand, and later fashion photographer Herb Ritts. These advertising campaigns won Abercrombie and Fitch a devoted gay following.

The apparel consisted of woven shirts, denim, miniskirts, cargo shorts, wool sweaters, polo shirts, and T-shirts. Its prices were unprecedentedly high in the teen apparel industry. Sales rose $85 million in 1992, $111 million in 1993, and to $165 million in 1994. 49 stores were opened by 1994, and a 102 store count was aimed by the end of 1995. In 1994, new records for merchandise margin rate and profitability were established by Abercrombie & Fitch for its parent, The Limited. To maintain popularity and to keep up with teen trends, Jeffries hired executives to keep up on popular teenage clothing, music, and entertainment.

By the mid-1990s, there were dozens of Abercrombie & Fitch stores in the United States. On September 26, 1996, The Limited, Inc. took Abercrombie & Fitch public on the New York Stock Exchange with the ticker symbol "ANF" and with the per share offering as $16. In late 1990s, the company began to opt building stores only averaging between 8,000 and 20,000 square feet (700 to 2,000 m^{2}) in high-volume retail centers around the country. It also launched the canoe store prototype of white facade and interior gray walls to accommodate the growth of its brand.

In 1997, Abercrombie & Fitch launched A&F Quarterly. The publication included photography, interviews and articles about sex, pop culture, and other teen interests. In 1998, the company introduced its first subsidiary, abercrombie. The concept was designed as the Abercrombie & Fitch for a younger clientele between the ages on 7–14. In 1999 began a 3-year-long class action lawsuit in which Abercrombie & Fitch was one of several American retailers involved for its sweatshops in Saipan. Revenue recorded for Abercrombie & Fitch at the end of fiscal 1998 was at US$805.2 million. By 1998, Abercrombie & Fitch became an independent company, and Mike Jeffries assumed the position of Chairman and chief executive officer. As the brand regained its prominence, industry analysts began to speculate how long Abercrombie and Fitch would be able to retain its popularity.

Analysts predicted that A&F would fall from popularity, but sales continued escalating after a provocative Christmas 1999 in which the A&F Quarterly issue of the season featured sexually explicit content that drew angry complaints. In 1999, the A&F also launched "A&F TV", which featured young people engaged in sports and leisure activities. A&F TV was originally developed to run on cable television and on monitors in Abercrombie & Fitch stores. It was soon removed. Revenue for fiscal 1999 was at ▲US$1.030 billion.

The overall approach of Abercrombie & Fitch, by the end of the decade, to its customers seemed to please male shoppers more than females, who shopped more frequently at competitor shops. Throughout the 1990s, Abercrombie & Fitch Co. enjoyed sales of over ▲$400/ft^{2} (▲$4300/m^{2}). By December 1999, Abercrombie & Fitch operated a total of 212 stores nationwide.

=== From 2000 on ===
Entering into the 21st century, Abercrombie & Fitch was rated as the sixth most popular brand before Nintendo and Levi's by teenagers. The company introduced its third brand, Hollister Co., in July 2000. The third concept was based on Southern California surf lifestyle, and was targeted towards high school students. After Hollister lowered the revenue of Abercrombie & Fitch, the company launched the Ezra Fitch collection, and began producing A&F clothing with higher grade materials, increasing the prices. In 2001, the company moved into a new 300-acre (1.2 km^{2}) home office in New Albany, Ohio. Headquarters were further expanded by 2003. Also in 2003, the company released its last issue of A&F Quarterly after amounting complaints.

The trademark slogan, Casual Luxury

After successfully launching Hollister, the company introduced its fourth brand RUEHL No.925 for older consumers, 22 through 35, on September 24, 2004. Revenue continued to escalate as sales are reported at $2.021 billion for 2004. In November 2005, the company opened doors to its first ever flagship store (located in Fifth Avenue). By this time, the company begins to uplift its image to near-luxury status after introducing the trademark Casual Luxury for promotion. Revenue reported for 2005 was $2.021 billion.

Abercrombie & Fitch began its Canadian expansion in January 2006 when the company opened two A&F stores and three Hollister Co. stores in Toronto and Edmonton. By fall 2006, a third Canadian Abercrombie & Fitch store opened in the Toronto Eaton Centre. Also in the year, the brand opened a west coast flagship in The Grove. Revenue reported for 2006 is $3.318 billion, an increase of over $1.297 billion from 2005.

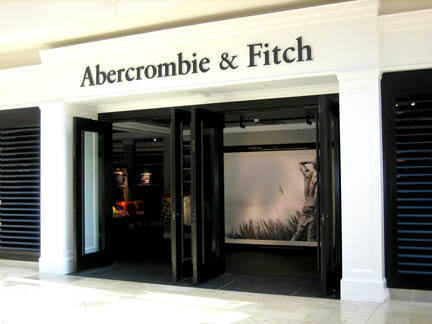
A&F Canoe store with louvers at The Mall at Millenia in Orlando, Florida, in 2007

Beginning 2007, the canoe stores were revamped with dark louvers (see right image). On 22 March 2007, Abercrombie & Fitch opened its first European flagship in London at 7 Burlington Gardens in Savile Row. The store generated a volume of $280,000 (around £140,000 GBP) in its first 6 hours of operation. The flagship remains one of the most profitable A&F locations. Revenue reached record heights in 2007 with an overall sales of $3.749 billion. The location closed in 2020.

On 21 January 2008, Abercrombie & Fitch introduced its fifth concept, the intimate apparel brand Gilly Hicks. Inspired by "Down Under", it is officially labeled as the "Cheeky cousin of Abercrombie & Fitch." In April 2008, A&F relaunched A&F Quarterly for release in the UK flagship. On August 31, 2008, the "bright and insightful" company director Allan A. Tuttle died. By December 22, corporate announced that it had produced a new employment agreement with Mike Jeffries set to expire in 2014. For the first time in its recent history, A&F suffered a financial decrease to $3.540 billion revenue for fiscal 2008. The blame was to the current economic recession, and also to the fact that the company refused to lower price points and offer sales citing brand image-protection that doing so would "cheapen" its near-luxury image.

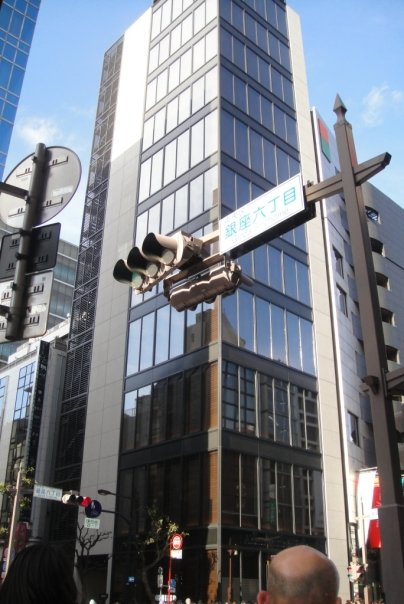
The first A&F flagship in Asia, located in Ginza

As the late-2000s recession continued, A&F noticeably suffered financially for its refusal to lower prices or offer discounts. Early in January 2009, the company reported its worst drop in sales and shares. By the end of the month, 50 employees lost their jobs and many positions were still unoccupied. 170 more employees were dismissed in May. A&F announced on June 17, 2009, the closure of its ailing Ruehl No.925 brand by January 2010. By October, A&F launched its official Facebook page. Despite financial downturns, A&F opened its second European location, a flagship store, in Milan on October 29. On its official Facebook page, A&F called it the biggest consumer reception for a flagship opening in A&F history: "like nothing the world has seen before". On December 15, another flagship store opened in Tokyo, Japan. Marking the first ever A&F location in Asia, the opening became the biggest retail event in history, was noted as a "spectacle of consumerism" by the Japanese, and made around JP¥50 million (US$550,000) that day alone.

In January 2010, A&F launched its A&F Cares feature highlighting its philanthropic efforts. Keeping to its commitment, the company shut down ruehl.com on January 22, and closed doors to all final Ruehl stores by the end of the month. Analysts began noting encouraging signs of financial progress, in March, for the company, citing A&F's successful international expansion and better inventory management. Also around that time, a historical fishing line dryer, made by A&F in the early 1900s, was sold to an A&F model for US$590. As a marketing move, A&F announced the relaunch of the A&F Quarterly on 17 July 2010 as a part of its "Screen Test" Back-to-School marketing campaign designed to attract more consumer attention and sales. In August, CEO Mike Jeffries announced that Abercrombie & Fitch would close roughly 60 stores in 2010. Later that month, CFO Jonathan Ramsden said another 50 stores could close in 2011. Profits began to pick up by September 2010 to larger than predicted results (attributed to the result of the major "Screen Test" campaign and numerous sales held throughout the season). By October, the company was stated as being well ahead its competitors (a first since the economic turndown). The brand opened a flagship in Copenhagen and Fukuoka in November 2010, and another one in Paris by May 2011.

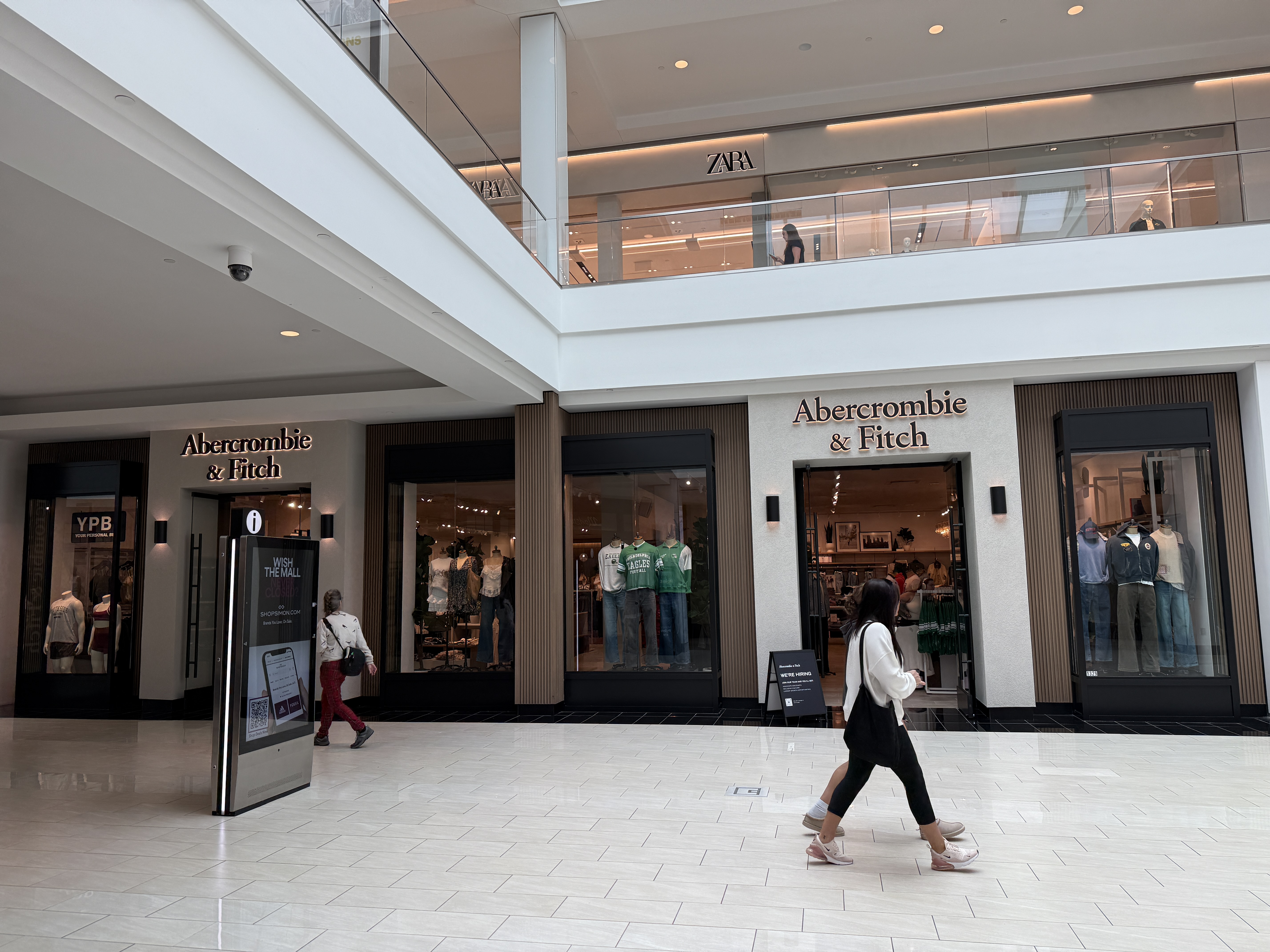
Modern Abercrombie & Fitch store located at the King of Prussia Mall in King of Prussia, Pennsylvania

On February 15, 2012, A&F announced plans to close 180 more underperforming U.S. stores by 2015 while continuing to expand in Europe and Asia.

In 2013, the company's trendy, upscale image took a hit when comments made by Jeffries in 2006 that disparaged customers with body types that do not resemble Abercrombie & Fitch models resurfaced. The resulting backlash launched a viral internet campaign called "Fitch the Homeless", which aimed to subvert and mock the company's carefully manicured image of "exclusionary" style by distributing used Abercrombie & Fitch clothes to homeless and needy persons.

The Hollister flagship store in New York City was closed in 2019. By 2021, Abercrombie & Fitch flagship locations in Düsseldorf, Germany; London, England; Munich, Germany; and Paris, France; Brussels, Belgium; Madrid, Spain; and Fukuoka, Japan were all closed. The original flagship location in New York City was also slated to close but has remained open.
