= Griffin & Howe =

American firearms manufacturer

Griffin & Howe, Inc.
- Company type: Private
- Industry: Arms Industry; Gunsmith; Clothing retailing
- Founded: 1923; New York, New York
- Founder: Seymour Griffin; James V. Howe
- Headquarters: Andover, New Jersey, USA
- Area served: Worldwide
- Key people: Steven Polanish, CEO
- Products: Bolt-action rifles; Side-by-side shotguns; Over-and-under shotguns
- Services: Gunsmithing; Shooting Instruction; Storage
- Number of employees: 24
- Website: griffinhowe.com

Griffin & Howe, Inc. is an American firearms manufacturer headquartered in Andover, New Jersey. Founded in 1923 by Seymour Robert Griffin, a New York City cabinetmaker, and James Virgil Howe, foreman of the machine shop at the Frankford Arsenal in Pennsylvania.

== History ==
Griffin was employed as the in-house carpenter and cabinetmaker at the Hotel Bretton Hall in Manhattan at 2346 Broadway. In 1910 Griffin, having read of Theodore Roosevelt's use of a sporterized .30-03 Springfield on a safari to Kenya and Uganda, decided to turn his own M1903 Springfield rifle into a sporter. He purchased a Circassian walnut blank from Von Lengerke & Detmold. In his spare time at the woodwork shop of Bretton Hall, Griffin continued to manufacture gunstocks converting surplus military M1903 Springfield rifles to sporting rifles. Griffin's distinctive hand-checkered Circassian walnut gunstocks featured schnabel fore-ends and a unique downward-angled slope cut into the right side of the stock parallel to the bolt ejection port. A few of these rifles featured engraving by R.J. Kornbrath. Early rifles were unmarked until Griffin began using a small S.R.Grffin New York banner in 1922.

Colonel Townsend Whelen who was then in command of the Frankford Arsenal in Philadelphia, Pennsylvania. played a large role in the inception of the company. In April 1923 Col. Whelen told Griffin about the talents of the head of the machine shop at the arsenal, James Virgil Howe, and suggested that they combine their skills to produce custom rifles. Also assisting, and providing the necessary startup capital, were James M. Holsworth, and James L. Gerry. On June 1, 1923 Griffin & Howe opened its doors and built rifles out of a New York City loft. The partnership was short-lived, for Howe left the firm in September of that year to work for Hoffman Arms Company of Cleveland, Ohio; but Howe's name remained on the hundreds of M1903 Springfield and Gewehr 98 rifle actions converted through the 1920's.

In 1927 the Griffin & Howe Sidemount scopemount was introduced. This mount allowed for a mounted and sighted scope to be removed and replaced without the zero being affected.

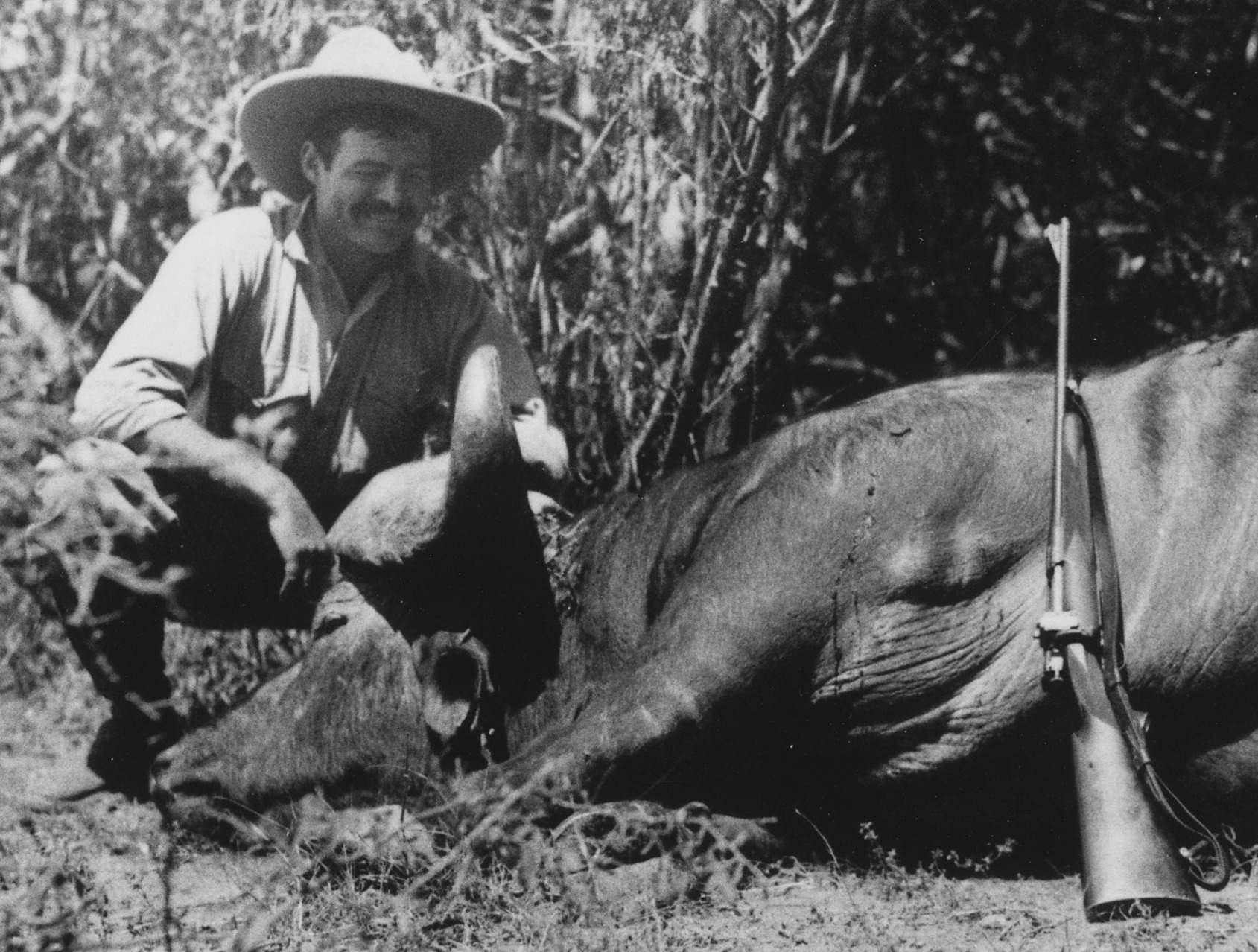
Ernest Hemingway with his 1930 .30-06 G&H Springfield M1903 and buffalo taken on African safari

Griffin & Howe was bought by Abercrombie & Fitch in 1930. Griffin & Howe became the main firearm and gunroom of the outfitter for the next 45 years. From the 1930s to the 1960s, G&H supplied sporting rifles to customers including Ernest Hemingway, Clark Gable, Bing Crosby, Dwight D. Eisenhower, Robert C. Ruark, Osa Johnson, Gary Cooper, Jack O'Connor, William B. Ruger, and Tom Selleck.

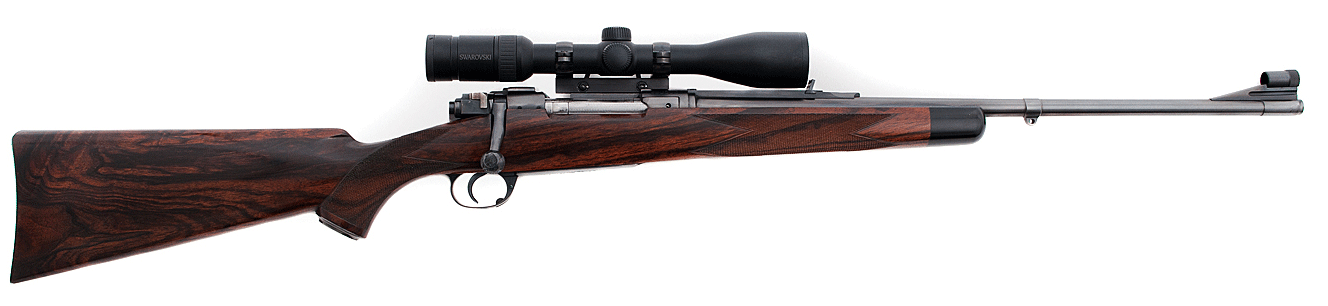
Griffin & Howe Custom Sporter with detachable Sidemount

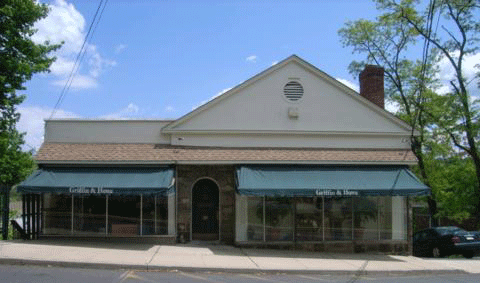
The storefront used by Griffin & Howe for nearly 30 years

In 1935 Griffin & Howe had opened the first shooting school in the U.S., at what is now the Orvis Shooting Grounds in Sandanona, New York.

During World War II, G&H was forced to discontinue its rifle business and turned to making the triggers for US anti-aircraft guns, along with over 50 different parts for the American aircraft industry. In addition to this, the G&H side mount became the standard rifle mount for the M1 Garand rifle, and by the end of the war, 23,000 had been delivered to the Springfield Armory.

In 1976, G&H was sold by Abercrombie & Fitch to longtime employee, Bill Ward. The company moved its headquarters to Bernardsville, New Jersey in 1987, with the present management taking over in 1989. The company opened two new locations in Greenwich, Connecticut in 1999 and in 2003 at its Shooting School at the Hudson Farm Club in Andover.

In 2011 Griffin & Howe moved its gunsmithing operations to a newly renovated, 6,000 square feet (560 m^{2}) facility to alongside the Shooting School at the Hudson Farm Club. In 2015, the company brought all of its operations to its shooting school location in Andover, NJ.
