= A&F Quarterly =

American lifestyle periodical by Abercrombie & Fitch

- Editor-in-chief: Savas Abadsidis
- Staff writers: Patrick Carone, Gary Kon, Sean T. Collins
- Photographer: Bruce Weber
- Categories: Magalog, lifestyle, sex, entertainment, travel, interviews
- Frequency: quarterly
- Circulation: 1.2 million (early 2000s)
- Publisher: Shahid & Company, New York
- Founder: Mike Jeffries
- First issue: Fall 1997
- Final issue: Christmas 2003
- Company: Abercrombie & Fitch
- Country: United States
- Language: English
- Website: A&F Quarterly

A&F Quarterly was an American lifestyle periodical by Abercrombie & Fitch.

The magazine to serve as a promotional vehicle, being targeted towards the college-aged youth (18–22). Its contents prominently feature photo spreads by A&F photographer Bruce Weber and also encompassed a variety of articles on lifestyle, sex, entertainment, travel, dining, and celebrity interviews.

The Quarterly's inclusion of nudity and sexuality has been a continual controversial topic. Positive criticism during its initial American run (1997–2003) called it an ingenious marketing tool, the envy of the publishing world, which "redefined the All-American look for teenagers." Negative criticism summarized the catalog as "soft porn" and racy. There were numerous lawsuits and boycotts focusing on moral and religious grounds which included the National Coalition for the Protection of Children and Families, the American Decency Association, and the Focus on the Family organization.

Abercrombie & Fitch discontinued A&F Quarterly in 2003, and later resurfaced it as a one-time limited edition exclusively for the European market (2008). A&F Quarterly returned in 2010 as an element for the Back-to-School marketing campaign, becoming the first issue sold simultaneously worldwide.

During its American publication, circulation reached a peak of 1.2 million. The Quarterly had a distribution of about 200,000 copies through sales in Abercrombie & Fitch stores (at US$6.00 a copy) and subscriptions ($12.00 a year). Advertisements for A&F Quarterly appeared in Interview, Out, Rolling Stone, and Vanity Fair.

== Original American run (1997-2003) ==
=== Initial launch of the "magalog" ===
Abercrombie & Fitch introduced A&F Quarterly as a marketing tool to express the A&F lifestyle. The Quarterly was meant to further establish the image of Abercrombie & Fitch as synonymous with sex and youth: The "neo-preppy and all-American perfection." The publication was coined a "magalog" for its purpose of serving as both a magazine and a catalog for the A&F brand. Its contents focused on entertaining, and giving advice to, the collegiate youth with an emphasis of having youthful fun and exploring sexuality.

The company collaborated with prominent figures in the fashion marketing world to produce the publication: Savas Abadsidis, Sam Shahid, and Bruce Weber. Weber had been recognized before for his erotic beefcake photography, and Shahid was notable for his Brooke Shields' "Nothing comes between me and my Calvins" Calvin Klein and his Banana Republic's "Free Souls" campaign. The two had previously worked together at Calvin Klein. For the Quarterly, Abadsidis served as editor-in-chief, Shahid as creative director, and Weber as exclusive photographer. Weber splashed A&F Quarterly with nudity (though non-frontal) and erotic heterosexuality and homosexuality.

A&F Quarterly made its debut in June 1997 and quickly became popular. Subsequent publications were released on a quarterly basis, one for each Abercrombie & Fitch fashion season ("Spring Break", "Summer", "Back-to-School", and "Christmas"). The first issue was considered relatively tame, with subsequent publications becoming more and more explicit. Abercrombie & Fitch stores required over-age proof and obscured cover nudity; nonetheless, parents complained that the publication found its way to younger-aged children.

A&F spokesperson Hampton Carney said, "it is beautiful fashion photography. It's clean, sexy, and we think our customers will really love it."

=== A&F vs American Eagle ===
In June 1998, Abercrombie & Fitch filed a lawsuit against rival clothing retailer American Eagle Outfitters in the U.S. District Court for the Southern District of Ohio, alleging that "AE impermissibly copied the designs of certain articles of clothing, in-store advertising displays, and a catalog [A&F Quarterly]." In July 1999, the court granted American Eagle's motion for summary judgment in its favor.

According to A&F's initial complaint, the company identified A&F Quarterly as one of its "unique and inherently distinctive features"

the creation of a cutting edge "cool" image through photographs and advertising and promotional material, such as the A&F Quarterly (the "catalog" or "Quarterly"). The Quarterly presents the Abercrombie brand and trade dress in a unique manner: namely, it features the Abercrombie brand and trade dress in a "cutout" or "clothesline" style [as opposed to only depicting models wearing its apparel] and uses color bars to illustrate the available colors of the item, while combining a consistent conceptual theme with a lifestyle editorial content of music, electronics, books, and magazine features. The catalog is printed on cougar vellum paper, which is unique for a catalog.

The district court ruled that what A&F described as its distinctive trade dress was (in the words of the appellate court) "too generic and descriptive" to warrant protection under the Lanham Act. A&F appealed this judgment to the United States Court of Appeals for the Sixth Circuit, which again ruled for American Eagle. The court stated that "Abercrombie's clothing designs and in-store presentations are legally functional non-protectable trade dress and that Abercrombie could not possibly have carried its burden of proving that American's catalog was confusingly similar to what we have presumed is the protectable trade dress of Abercrombie's Quarterly."

The Court of Appeals, in the course of comparing the two stores' catalogs, described the Quarterly as follows:

Abercrombie uses grainy images of exceptionally fit and attractive young people in outdoor (often collegiate) settings, alone and in groups, wearing more or less A&F clothing in ways that convey their allegiance to the brand while also seemingly attempting to create a sexual mystique about the wearer....Throughout the Quarterly, A&F makes extensive use of photographs depicting apparently college-aged people in often erotic or homoerotic poses or situations wearing clothes with A&F logos displayed more or less prominently. A&F works with noted fashion photographer Bruce Weber, whose style is well-known in the industry and recognizable by even the uninitiated.

The court concluded that although the above characteristics distinguished the Quarterly from AE's catalog,

No rational trier of fact could conclude that the overall appearances created by the configuration of the two catalogs are similar....There is so little danger of a consumer picking up the two catalogs and not quickly realizing that they emanate from different sources that judgment as a matter of law for American Eagle is appropriate.

=== Mounting protest and concern ===
Mothers Against Drunk Driving spoke out against the Quarterly after its 1998 "Back-to-School" issue featured alcoholic drink recipes (with names such as "Brain Hemorrhage") and instructions for a drinking game. The Center for Science in the Public Interest also protested the "Drinking 101" promotion, which advised: "Rather than the standard beer binge, indulge in some creative drinking this semester." The article included recipes for ten mixed drinks and a spinner featuring pictures of each drink, intended to be used in various drinking games. Abercrombie & Fitch ordered the drinking game pages removed from its stores' remaining copies and sent apology letters to its subscribers.

In 1999, Illinois lieutenant governor Corinne Wood called for a consumer boycott of Abercrombie & Fitch because of the sexually explicit nature of the Quarterly's "Naughty or Nice" holiday issue, which included nude photographs and an interview with porn star Jenna Jameson. Among the images that stirred controversy was a picture of Santa and Mrs. Claus engaging in sadomasochistic behavior, across the page from the statement "Sometimes it's good to be bad." The Illinois Coalition of Sexual Assault assisted the boycott. That same year, Michigan attorney general (and later governor) Jennifer Granholm sent a letter to the company complaining that the holiday catalog contained sexual material that could not be distributed to minors under Michigan law. The catalog featured an A&F "sexpert" who offered advice on "sex for three" and told readers willing to "go down" on a date at the movies that it was acceptable, "just so long as you do not disturb those around you." Four states threatened legal action over the issue.

In 2001, cultural conservatives and anti-porn feminists called for a boycott of A&F over the Summer 2001 issue of A&F Quarterly, which included photographs of naked or near-naked young people frolicking on the beach. The images also included top-naked young women and rear-naked young men on top of each other. The head of Concerned Christians of America said, "The exploitation of sex and young people in A&F's catalog is not only atrocious but also a psychological molestation of their teen-age customers." The National Organization for Women criticized the catalog for promoting "unrealistic body types" and displaying images that simulate group sex. The catalog included an interview with porn star Ron Jeremy, who discussed performing oral sex on himself and using a dildo cast from his own penis.

The Back-to-School 2001 issue (subtitled The Brightest) featured a fictitious A&F University backdrop. Photos of women splashing naked in a fountain were inspired by Katharine Hepburn's supposed skinny-dipping at Bryn Mawr College. Another set was inspired by a UC Berkeley student that spent a day nude in class. The typical protest followed the release.

No issues were distributed during the Christmas season following the September 11 attacks, because the company felt the tone of the publication was not suitable for the mood at that time.

Creative Director Sam Shahid generated more criticism with his January 2003 statement: "We don't buckle under to criticism. We feel we're right about what we're doing, I'm not out to hurt anybody and nobody is damaged by any of this."

=== Non-A&F advertisements ===
Shahid stated that A&F had been thinking about providing commercial space in A&F Quarterly for a long time. The company finally made four spreads available in the Summer 2002 issue, which were bought by Sony Computer Entertainment (for the PlayStation 2 video game console), SoBe, The WB Television Network (promoting Smallville, which starred previous A&F model Tom Welling), and Trek Bicycle Corporation. Spokesmen for WB told The New York Times that they found it intriguing and took the ad space because A&F assured they would be the only television advertiser. Spokeswomen for SoBe called the Quarterly a "good fit" because SoBe targets the same age group as A&F.

=== The decision to discontinue ===
For Christmas 2003, Abercrombie & Fitch released its most controversial Quarterly yet. It was 280 pages and was subtitled David Abercrombie & Ezra Fitch's Christmas Field Guide. The cover proclaimed in bold letters, "280 pages of moose, ice hockey, chivalry, group sex and more." The inside features discussed tips for oral sex and displayed images of group sex and nude young adults frolicking in a river. Included was a letter from the editor which read: "We don't want much this year, but in keeping with the spirit, we'd like to ask forgiveness from some of the people we've offended over the years....If you'd be so kind, please offer our apologies to the following: the Catholic League, former Lt. Governor Corrine Wood of Illinois, the Mexican American Legal Defense and Education Fund, the Stanford University Asian American Association, N.O.W." The reaction was an unprecedented wave of strong protest. While protest was mounting, a former model revealed that subjects unwilling to go nude were dismissed by Weber and Shahid, and that Weber constantly pressured them to "act sexier". A Quarterly contributor remarked, "They're [A&F] all about crossing the lines, but this time they drew a line in the sand. They were kind of asking for it."

On December 9, 2003, Abercrombie & Fitch announced its decision to withdraw the issue and to end the publication, stating that the Christmas issue would be its last. Chairman and CEO Mike Jeffries stated that he ended the Quarterly because he was "bored" with it. A company spokesperson said that "we just felt it was time to retire it and come back with something that has beautiful imagery and classical photos." Another statement from the company said that "while [A&F] has enjoyed success with the quarterly over the years, the company believes it is time for new thinking and looks forward to unveiling an innovative and exciting campaign in the spring." Copies were removed from store shelves, and the remainder were distributed only to subscribers.

A&F had finished shooting for A&F Quarterly Spring 2004 in Rome in October 2003.

==== Reactions ====
There were many reports that the editor-in-chief Savas Abadsidis was "quietly" fired a week before December 9. The reason told was that there had been "creative differences over the Quarterly's next step." A&F executives hoped that the controversy over the Christmas Field Guide would die down, but it did not, and so the decision to discontinue had to be made. Many of the activists groups saw their role against the publication as the major factor in its downfall.

Abercrombie & Fitch analysts received the decision with praise. Supposedly, the Quarterly was discontinued because it took up time and money that should have been allocated to more important company issues: "It was more trouble than it was worth." Store sales had been declining, with a major fall in November 2003 of 13%. As a result, the analysts/investors were being hit really hard financially. It was expected that without the weight of the Quarterly, A&F could focus more on producing better results for upcoming fiscal quarters. Analyst Robert Buchanan from A.G. Edwards & Sons wrote to investors that A&F Quarterly was unimportant in his view, and, that by recognizing this, A&F should be able to bring business back up by focusing on its clothing. Jeffrey Klinefelter of U.S. Bancorp Piper Jaffray echoed this sentiment, hoping that the US$33 used towards the publication and marketing would help launch a successful Spring Break 2004.

The decision did not change the contempt with which some community-focused groups viewed Abercrombie & Fitch. The big question on every critic's mind was addressed by the Focus on the Family: "[Abercrombie & Fitch] will stop producing pornographic catalogues, but what will replace them?" Phil Burress, president of Citizens for Community Values, commented that "they [Abercrombie & Fitch] have a track record of sexual exploitation and there are many different ways to continue that campaign." Burres had previously posted an advertisement in The Wall Street Journal to question if A&F's investors really knew what they were investing in. Alissa Quart penned the book Branded: The Buying and Selling of Teenagers and had negative view towards the defunct publication: "It became more of an emblem than anything else. It served as an icon for the hypocrisy of America's attitude toward youth, using it as a sign of innocence while at the same time peddling a semi pornographic catalogue at them."

== Absence (2004–2007) ==
Out-of-print copies of the Quarterly have become highly sought after as collectibles. eBay is the target destination for purchasing the rare periodicals; on the site, a single copy received a bid of US$122.50 after just four hours and thirty minutes on auction.

In 2004, the defunct publication was replaced with A&F Magazine/A&F: Rising Stars, a tame collection of photos and essays about rising young celebrities. It featured Justin Bruening, Poppy Montgomery, Olivia Wilde (all from Back-to-School 2004) and Jeremy Bloom (Christmas 2004). This magazine was far less popular than the Quarterly and was soon discontinued, and for a time the company published a seasonal catalog.

== A "Return to Paradise" (2008 release) ==
=== Background and criticism ===
In 2008, Abercrombie & Fitch announced that it would relaunch A&F Quarterly exclusively for the European market, mainly the United Kingdom, where A&F hoped consumers would be more open-minded than Americans. The company planned a release in March or April 2008 in the A&F London flagship store – just over a year after the opening of the first international A&F flagship at 7 Burlington Gardens in Savile Row London, England.

Tom Lennox, vice president of corporate communications for Abercrombie & Fitch, stated, "We have chosen to bring the A&F Quarterly to the UK because our London flagship has been a phenomenal success and we were looking for something which we felt would appeal to the British open-minded approach to culture and creativity." The new European version was to be "more mature" than the previous editions in the United States, where, Lennox says, it will no longer be sold because it "has run its course" in America. Lennox said it would be more of a "sophisticated, intellectual approach" providing a "global perspective, which is what the 20-year-old is all about." Lastly, he commented that the Quarterly will be fun and may be found "controversial to some". Saying that the revamped Quarterly will stick to a "similar theme", a company representative also commented that "it will be unique and will definitely grab people's attention." It was announced that the original creative team behind the American A&F Quarterly (including Shahid and Weber) would reunite for the publication's revival in London. Featured topics would include travel, dining, and trendy neighborhoods, with some articles written by Tyler Brule (founder of the fashion, art, and travel magazine Wallpaper).

Recalling the controversial years of the Quarterly, Claude Knight, director of the charity Kidscape, stated that "unless the 2008 version takes the fate of its predecessor into account, we will not hesitate to raise grave concerns [about] a racy magazine aimed at teenagers and featuring sexually explicit content." The deputy executive of 4Children warned that careless promotion of sexual images and alcohol drinking could leave great consequences, especially in the UK, where there is "a high drinking culture and there are links between the use of alcohol and sex that is later regretted."

A UK£100 price and a massive customer turnout was expected at the flagship store over the returning publication. Market analysis revealed that the relaunch of the Quarterly in Europe came at an opportune time for Abercrombie & Fitch because tolerance for less-regulated publications is higher there, and the demand for the A&F brand is high and on the rise. This was the reason for why A&F began international expansion in the UK first.

=== The issue ===
A&F Quarterly hit shelves in the London A&F flagship on April 5, 2008 (a month later than was anticipated). The limited edition issue of 500 (2000 in total print run) copies was entitled Return to Paradise and was labeled with a price of UK£100 (US$159.00). The company set strict measures to regulate to whom the issue was sold. Demand for the edition, a worldwide exclusive, was high throughout the season. During the season, a copy was sold on eBay for £249.99 (about US$493.88).

The issue is a hardcover and is "lavishly bound" similarly to RUEHL books also by Bruce Weber. The photography carries out an overall theme of "Paradise", with models photographed with and around exotic flora. An allusion is made toward Adam and Eve in the way that two nude models behold a bitten apple. Many of the images used in the Spring 2008 season the Quarterly were also displayed in stores. Vogue UK called Weber's photography "hyper-sexy".

== 2010 comeback ==
The A&F Quarterly was resurrected as a promotional element for the Back-to-School 2010 marketing campaign titled "Screen Test".

Abercrombie & Fitch had remained tight-lipped over its plans to reintroduce A&F Quarterly throughout the whole process (2009–2010). The company introduced the "A&F Book" feature on its online store for Christmas 2009 as a collection of seasonal photography themed "FIERCE". The feature was updated for Spring 2010 in February. It was titled "Spring Fever" and remained up until April when it was removed. On regarding its "Back-to-School" 2010 campaign, in January 2010, on its iPhone app, A&F had only commented, "Brr...!!! February will be the next photo shoot for the Back-to-School/Christmas 2010 campaign. We've got our fingers crossed that we'll be going somewhere sunny, warm, and sandy..."

On 17 June 2010, Abercrombie & Fitch officially announced on its Facebook page that it is relaunching A&F Quarterly: "It's Back. Mom found it under the bed. Bought another one. Bro stole every copy. Bought more. ...Girlfriend... She just shook her head, and then 'borrowed it.' Bought back stock. The Quarterly. It's BACK! Pre-order your copy today...it's got all the things A&F does best...Abs, hot bodies and a whole lot more..." Within the following days, the announcement made headlines through various reputable news sources and fashion blogs.

An A&F spokesperson told Stylelist, "[A&F Quarterly will be] part of a larger marketing campaign that ties in with in-store happenings in July. [It'll be] sexy, playful, and provocative -- it's everything we love about Abercrombie & Fitch." Stylelist also became the first source to be provided a preview to the Quarterly. Soon after, Fashionista.com offered never-before-seen photography from the upcoming Quarterly.

"From where movie legends are made, A&F Studios reigns as the golden dream machine. Stories of a new generation of rising stars with a gleam of hope and an open eye towards their own chance at the coveted A&F Screen Test, the flint to spark a trip to the stars." - A&F Quarterly theme, abercrombie.com, 2010

The A&F Quarterly will be part of the "Back-to-School" 2010 marketing campaign and its theme being an A&F "Hollywood screen test": A lead story will be offered mimicking American Idol: "The staff of A&F Studios opens up to editorial to explain the steps the division takes to find new, young, hot boys. The cattle-call approach to herd young talent ends with the best of the beefcake earning a screen test that 'could be the flint to spark the trip to the star'." Returning to the publication is Bruce Weber, who remains exclusive photographer for the A&F company and shot the images in February 2010. Behind-the-scenes shots will also provide a look behind Weber's A&F coveted photo shoots. Fashionista praised Weber's work as "sultry, voyeuristic, black and white...classic Weber."

Sources consider the move to reintroduce the publication as a drastic attempt to boost sales in the American market. Revenue has been minimally declining since the late-2000s recession began, and the Quarterly is noticeably credited for A&F's continued success in the early 2000s in a "pre-social media" environment. Analysts noticed the increase in revenue from the 2008 Quarterly relaunch in London, and will pay attention to the results of the 2010 American relaunch. There is a majority of optimism towards the relaunch, since A&F sales have been improving recently and the Quarterly is expected to lure in shoppers. RBC Capital Markets analyst Howard Tubin mentioned that the catalog probably won't make a material difference on earnings, but added that any media exposure related to the catalog will be a positive for the New Albany, Ohio-based company." TheConsumerist.com, however, commented the timing is inopportune: "For any company, let alone an apparel retailer, to be starting a magazine in this economy really bucks the trends," said Columbus retail consultant Chris Boring of Boulevard Strategies. "I just don't see the market out there for a $10 magazine, especially with teenagers so into technology. I would think the money would be better spent on some new mobile app."

Harkening back to the original American version, the new Quarterly was designed not as exclusive as was the 2008 release. With that said, the issue was made available for pre-order online abercrombie.com on June 17 for US$10 at 176 pages. Due to suggestive content, the publication was may only available for pick-up instore with identification. The plastic wrapping contained a warning notice in three languages (English, Italian, and Japanese) while the back cover read the pricing in six different currencies (USD $10, JPY ¥1600, EUR €12, CAD $14, GBP £10, DKK 100).

== List of issues ==
=== American ===
The following is a list of the A&F Quarterly publications released in the United States from 1997 through 2003. This list is missing several publications' subtitles. A collection of A&F Quarterly publications is housed at the Rubenstein Library at Duke University.

Note: No Quarterly was issued for Christmas 2001.

Issue number	Main title / Season released	Subtitle	Notes
1	Back-to-School 1997	Live it.	
2	Christmas 1997	A Cool Yule	
3	Spring Break 1998	Looking For Love	
4	Summer 1998	Seeking Serious Fun	
5	Back-to-School 1998	On The Road	Gave alcohol drink recipes and tips for great alcohol-related games for going back to the dorm.
6	Christmas 1998	Ring It In	
7	Spring Break 1999	Spring Fever	
8	Summer 1999	Summer Dreams	
9	Back-to-School 1999	Innocents Abroad	Photography was shot in and around London, England
10	Christmas 1999	Naughty or Nice	Featured interview with Jenna Jameson, advice on three-way and oral sex, and "naughty" Santa and wife photo.
11	Spring Break 2000	Wild & Willing	
12	Summer 2000	Go Play	
13	Back-to-School 2000	New York	
14	Christmas 2000	A Very Emerson Christmas	
15	Spring Break 2001	XXX	Featured the Carlson twins in (homoerotic poses and nude) playing football and frolicking in a lake.
16	Summer 2001	Let Summer Begin	Featured interview with Ron Jeremy and photos simulating group sex.
17	Back-to-School 2001	The Brightest	
18	Spring Break 2002	About Love...	
19	Summer 2002	Paradise Found	
20	Back-to-School 2002	Back To School	
21	Christmas 2002	Dear Saint Nick	
22	Spring Break 2003	Bring It On...	
23	Summer 2003	Presents...	
24	Back-to-School 2003	The Sex Ed Issue	Text to accompany the photographs by Slavoj Žižek.
25	Christmas 2003	David Abercrombie & Ezra Fitch's Christmas Field Guide	Articles on group, oral sex, and ice sports. Photographs of nude models in nature. Last American Quarterly.
26	Spring 2004 (Unreleased to public)		Was already completed by the time the company decided to discontinue the magazine. Had a few copies printed for select people.

=== European ===
This list focuses on the European publication released in 2008.

Issue number	Main title / Season released	Subtitle	Notes
27	Spring Break 2008	Return to Paradise	The first Quarterly in four years. Sold only in the London A&F flagship store.

=== Global ===
Due to A&F's ongoing international expansion, the relaunched 2010 A&F Quarterly became the first to be sold on a global scale through A&F's worldwide locations.

Issue number	Main title / Season released	Subtitle	Notes
28	Back-to-School 2010	Screen Test	Ties in with many marketing moves introduced for the BTS 2010 fashion season

== See also ==
- Nudity in art
- Sex in advertising
