= David T. Abercrombie =

Founder of Abercrombie & Fitch (1867-1931)

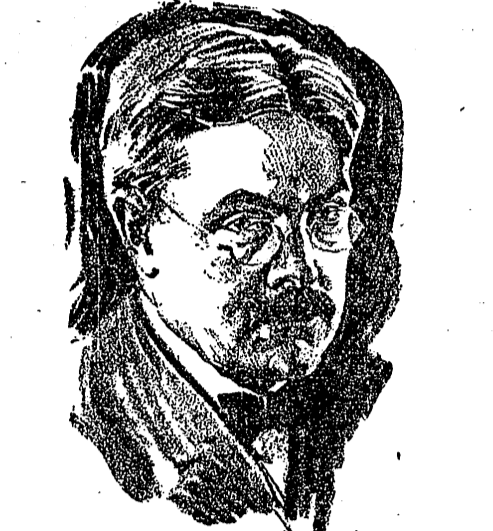
- Illustration of Abercrombie, 1917
- Born: David Thomas Abercrombie; June 6, 1867; Baltimore, Maryland, U.S.
- Died: August 29, 1931 (aged 64); Ossining, New York, U.S.
- Occupation: Surveyor
- Years active: 1892–1917
- Known for: Founder of Abercrombie & Fitch

David Thomas Abercrombie (June 6, 1867 – August 29, 1931) was the founder of the American brand Abercrombie & Fitch. A topographer and expert in the outdoors, Abercrombie opened the company as New York's outfitter for the elite and later partnered up with co-founder Ezra Fitch – both men managed the Company through years of success.

Today, his company, Abercrombie & Fitch Co. remains as a prominent American clothing brand. A brand in his name was released by the company in 1998 – abercrombie.

== Life and career ==
=== Birth, studies, and family ===
David T. Abercrombie was born in Baltimore, Maryland, on June 6, 1867, to John and Elizabeth Sarah Abercrombie (née Daniel). John owned and managed a local Baltimore iron works. David was of Scottish descent: his father John was born in Scotland as was his maternal grandfather. He had four children: Elizabeth, born 1897; Lucy, born 1899; David, born 1901; and Abbott, born 1909. He was educated in the public schools of Baltimore and by private instructors. Abercrombie later came to study at Baltimore City College and became a practicing civil engineer, topographer, and explorer, rising to the position of Chief of Survey for Norfolk & Western Railroad, notably mapping out uncharted wilderness areas in the coal and timber lands of West Virginia and the Carolinas. While surveying the wilderness areas, Abercrombie came to realize that the gear, both clothing and equipment, was wholly inadequate to withstand the rigorous demands. He started designing his own gear which was more rugged and versatile, and better designed to meet the wilderness environment.

=== Abercrombie & Fitch Co. ===
On June 4, 1892, he founded Abercrombie Co. as a small waterfront shop at No.36 South Street in downtown Manhattan, New York;

On April 25, 1896, Abercrombie married Lucy Abbot Cate in Baltimore. The couple had four children: Elizabeth, Lucy, David, and Abbott. The Abercrombie family lived in Newark, New Jersey, for some years and maintained a log cabin getaway on Pine Island on Greenwood Lake, New Jersey. Later they lived in Brooklyn, New York City, and finally in Ossining, New York.

In 1900, wealthy New York lawyer Ezra Fitch, a regular customer of Abercrombie's, bought into the successfully growing Abercrombie retail establishment. In 1904, it was incorporated and renamed "Abercrombie & Fitch Co." Abercrombie later entered into disputes with Ezra Fitch over Fitch's visions of expanding the company to appeal to the general public, as Abercrombie sought to maintain the company's standing as an elite store for the elite outdoorsman. Possibly as a result of this rift, Abercrombie left the Company in 1907, selling his share of it to Fitch.

=== Post A&F and death ===
In 1917, Abercrombie joined Baker, Murray & Imbrie ("The Sporting Goods Store of Expert Personal Service") as vice president. He later founded the "David T. Abercrombie Company", a New York City sportsmen's outfitter, and "Abercrombie Corporation", which packed commodities for export. In 1927 he finished work on a large granite castle in Ossining overlooking the Hudson River with a 300-acre estate, which he named Elda after the initials of his children's names. It has since fallen into disrepair. There he died, intestate, in 1931.

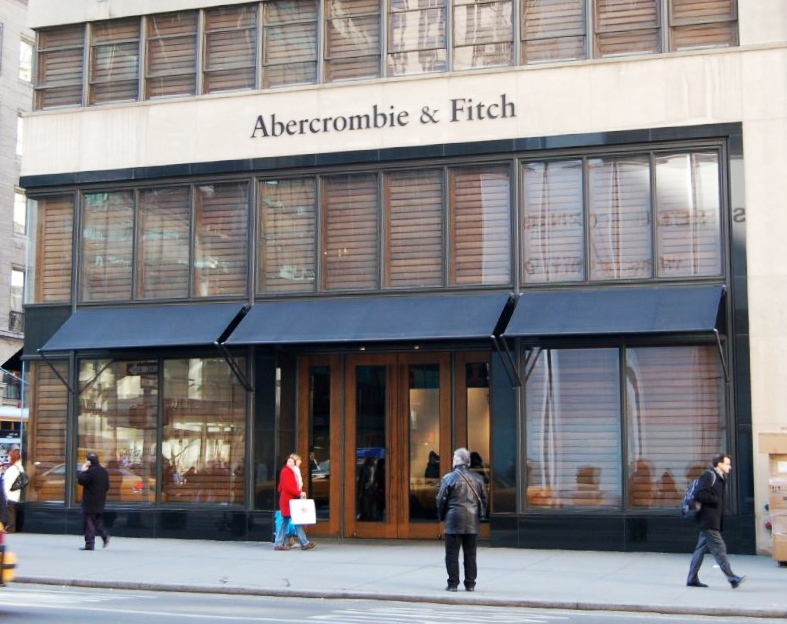
Abercrombie & Fitch's flagship store on Fifth Avenue in Manhattan, New York City

== Legacy ==
David Abercrombie's influence in his company has remained as a greater part of it, even after Abercrombie's departure and the company's 1960s-1970s financial issues. Repositioned in the 1980s as a lifestyle brand for the collegiate, Abercrombie & Fitch remains today as a cultural American brand. Although altered to accommodate its promoted image of "Casual Luxury", Abercrombie & Fitch continues to reference to its original image of its early years with the Abercrombie moose and "sexy" male ruggedness. Abercrombie's name is often used as an abbreviated form of the company's name and is used frequently more than Ezra Fitch's "Fitch" (e.g. "Abercrombie Christmas 2007", "abercrombie.com", "the Abercrombie lifestyle...", etc.). When the Company released a children's version of the A&F brand, abercrombie kids (all lowercase, as a metaphor for their diminutive clientele), it chose to name it after Abercrombie.
