= Bonadies =

Bonadies is a surname. Notable people with the surname include:

- Fran Horowitz-Bonadies (born 1963), American businesswoman
- Jack Bonadies (1892–1965), Italian American football player
- Simone Bonadies (died 1518), Roman Catholic prelate

== See also ==
- Codex Faenza, sometimes known as Codex Bonadies, 15th-century musical manuscript
