= Gilly Hicks =

Activewear brand

- Type: Division
- Industry: Retail
- Founded: January 21, 2008; 18 years ago
- Headquarters: New Albany, Ohio, U.S.
- Area served: United States, United Kingdom and Germany
- Key people: Fran Horowitz (CEO) and GM)
- Revenue: ▲US$ 40.283 million (2010)
- Parent: Abercrombie & Fitch
- Website: Gilly Hicks

Gilly Hicks is a brand owned by Abercrombie & Fitch, specializing in women's activewear.

Its first store opened at Natick Mall in Natick, Massachusetts on January 21, 2008. On November 6, 2013, Abercrombie & Fitch announced it would close Gilly Hicks' retail stores, but continue the brand's online operations. Gilly Hicks was resurrected in 2017 due to customer demand focusing in younger women. Since then, its products have been sold in all Hollister stores and online.

== Stores ==
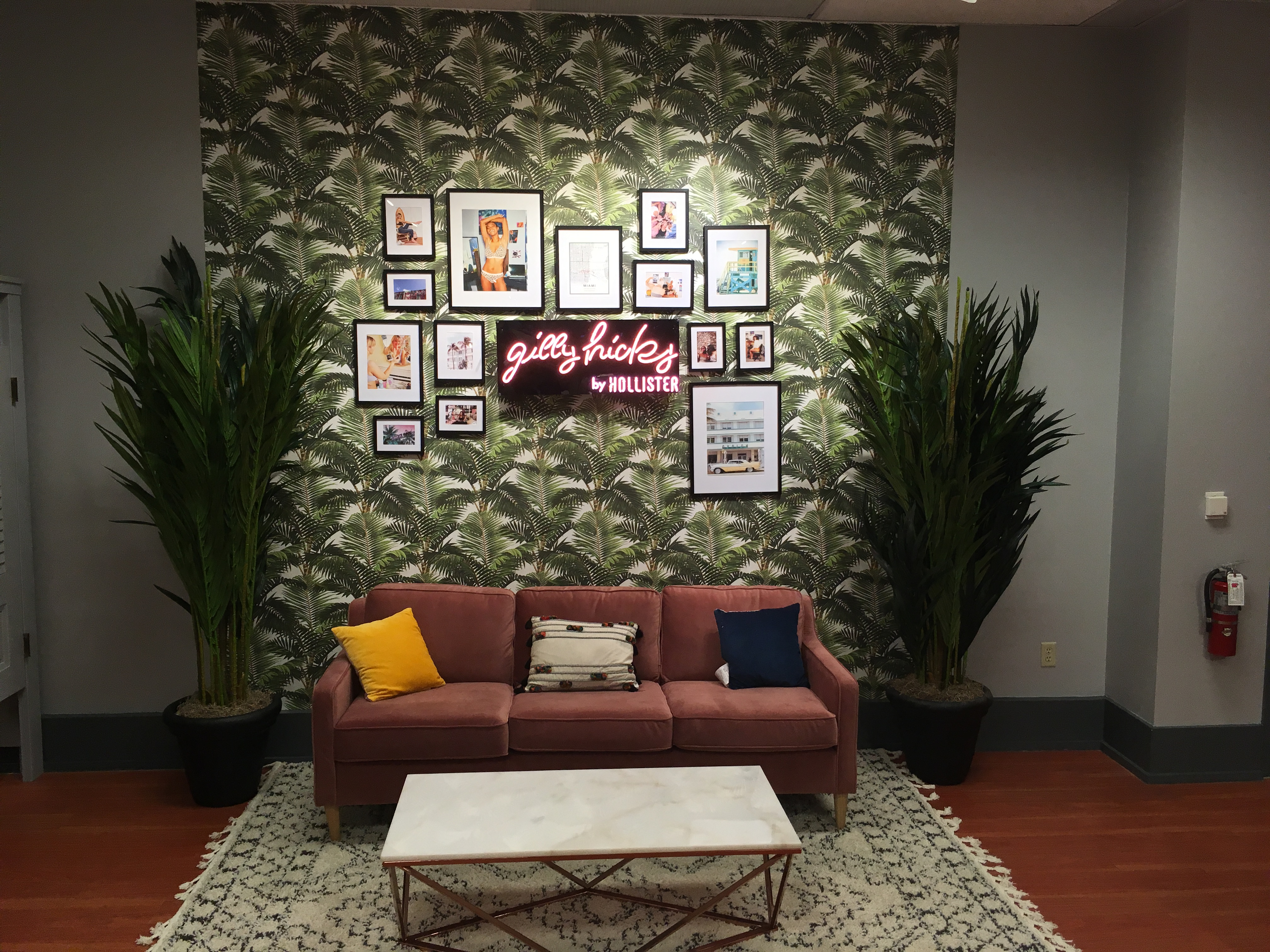
Lounge area at a pop-up Gilly Hicks at Miami's Dolphin Mall (July 2019)

In July 2019, Abercrombie & Fitch opened four Gilly Hicks pop-up stores. The stores, which were located at BrandBox in Tysons Corner Center (Tysons, VA), Dolphin Mall (Miami, FL), Los Cerritos Center (Cerritos, CA), and Baybrook Mall (Friendswood, TX), joined two existing Gilly Hicks stores at Ala Moana Center (Honolulu, HI) and Roosevelt Field Mall (East Garden City, NY).

In October 2019, Gilly Hicks opened a side by side location at the Hollister Co. at the Aventura Mall (Aventura, FL).

In July 2021, Gilly Hicks opened a new side by side location at Westfield London.

In February 2022, Abercrombie & Fitch confirmed a new Gilly Hicks location would open in Carnaby Street, London. This has since closed and Gilly Hicks is stocked within the Hollister store on Carnaby Street and Fouberts Place near Carnaby Street.

Stores based on information given above
Stores	City
Tysons Corner Center	Tysons, VA
Dolphin Mall	Miami, FL
Los Cerritos Center	Cerritos, CA
Baybrook Mall	Friendswood, TX
Ala Moana Center	Honolulu, HI
Roosevelt Field Mall	East Garden City, NY
Aventura Mall	Aventura, FL
Westfield London	London
Bluewater Shopping Centre	Stone, Kent
