= Fran Horowitz =

American businesswoman (born 1963)

- Born: October 1963 (age 62)
- Education: Lafayette College (BA); Fordham University (MBA)
- Occupation: Businessperson
- Known for: CEO of Abercrombie & Fitch
- Spouse: Michael Bonadies
- Children: 2

Fran Horowitz-Bonadies (born August 1963) is an American businesswoman. She is the CEO of Abercrombie & Fitch Co., a position she has held since her appointment in February 2017 following Mike Jeffries.

== Early life and education ==
Horowitz attended high school in Armonk, New York. She received a liberal arts degree from Lafayette College in 1985 and an MBA from Fordham University in 1990.

== Career ==
Horowitz began her career in buying positions at Bergdorf Goodman, Bonwit Teller, and Saks Fifth Avenue. She served for nine months as President of Ann Taylor Loft and in various corporate roles at Express, Inc. She also worked in merchandising roles at Bloomingdale's for 13 years.

=== Abercrombie & Fitch ===
Horowitz joined Abercrombie & Fitch in October 2014 as President of the Hollister brand. She served in this capacity for 13 months, building upon marketing, merchandising, and store operation changes put in motion years prior. She was promoted to president and Chief Merchandising Officer of Abercrombie & Fitch Co., a new corporate role, in December 2015. She served in this capacity for 13 months before being named CEO and member of the board of directors. Her 2017 annual compensation was $10.3 million of which roughly two-thirds were awarded in company stock.

== Personal life ==
Horowitz is married with two children, a daughter and a son. She lives in Columbus, Ohio.
