= Fierce (fragrance) =

Men's fragrance by Abercrombie & Fitch

FIERCE

Fragrance by Abercrombie & Fitch
- Released: 2002
- Label: Abercrombie & Fitch
- Perfumer(s): Christophe Laudamiel; Bruno Jovanovic
- Successor: Ezra Fitch
- Website: FIERCE at abercrombie.com

Fierce (marketed in bold red-lettering as "FIERCE") is a men's fragrance by Abercrombie & Fitch. The cologne was first introduced in 2002. Today, Fierce is the signature scent of the Abercrombie & Fitch brand.

Abercrombie & Fitch has sold over US$200 million of Fierce since 2002. A&F predict sales of Fierce to be at US$90 million for fiscal 2009.

Originally packaged in red, the cologne is now encased in a gray box.

Fierce is a Woody Aromatic fragrance for men. Fierce was created by Christophe Laudamiel and Bruno Jovanovic. Top notes are Fir, Lemon, Orange, Cardamom, Petitgrain and Sea Notes; middle notes are Rosemary, Lily-of-the-Valley, Jasmine, Rose and Sage; base notes are Musk, Vetiver, Oakmoss, Brazilian Rosewood and Sandalwood.

== Marketing ==
The marketing grayscale image for the fragrance is a "ripped male torso."

Fierce is the representative scent of A&F. The cologne is sprayed throughout the stores and on clothing as a form of marketing. A&F has spent over US$3 million for scent-spraying machines for its flagship stores. Increasingly, non-flagship stores are also being equipped with the ceiling installation fragrance distributors.

Abercrombie & Fitch's Christmas 2009 fashion season was themed "FIERCE". In a new marketing move, the seasonal photography bore quotations from prominent historical writers (Arthur Conan Doyle, Don Marquis, Henry Ward Beecher, and Gilbert K. Chesterton) all containing the word "FIERCE" in bold/red.

The fragrance has been marketed on highway billboards as well.

== Face Your Fierce campaign ==
In 2019, Abercrombie launched the "#FaceYourFierce" advertising campaign, as a way to try and shake the body-shaming image the store had cultivated. To coincide with the campaign, Abercrombie relaunched the Fierce cologne. Kristin Scott, president of global brands at Abercrombie & Fitch Co. said, "We are proud to introduce the redefined Fierce for our customers, and inspire them to see and share how they too embody Fierceness." She went on to say, "This iconic fragrance, which has been and will always be an integral part of the Abercrombie & Fitch brand, is ready to make a new and unforgettable impression.”

Later, they introduced different variants of their "Fierce" cologne, including "Fierce Icon", "Fierce Reserve", and "Fierce Blue".

== Controversies ==
=== Lawsuit against Beyoncé ===
On September 27, 2009, Abercrombie & Fitch filed a lawsuit against Beyoncé, because Beyoncé was releasing a fragrance and clothing line called "Sasha Fierce". Abercrombie & Fitch took action by filing a lawsuit accusing her of trademark infringement, unfair competition and deceptive trade practices because A&F already markets a men's cologne called Fierce. The company also cited a potential likelihood of confusion while sending Beyoncé a warning to "cease-and-desist." In response, Coty, the company Beyoncé hired for her fragrance, stated that the terms "Fierce" and "Sasha Fierce" were never intended to be used for the fragrance. The fragrance was later revealed to be named "Heat".

=== Other lawsuits ===
In August 2024, Abercrombie filed a lawsuit against 17 different companies for producing knockoff cologne, showing "reckless disregard or willful blindness" of Abercrombie's rights.
