= Abercrombie & Fitch =

American clothing company

Abercrombie & Fitch Co.

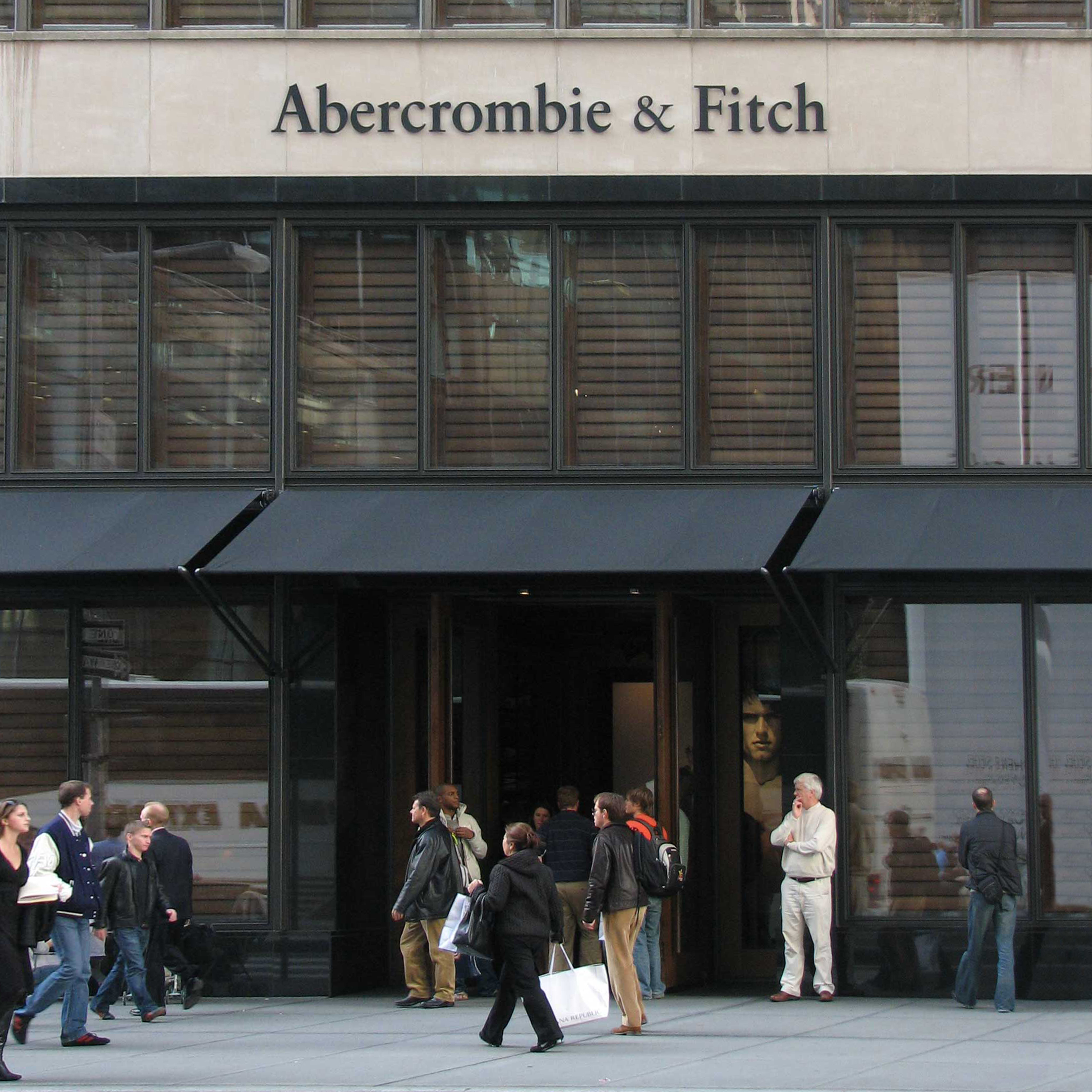
- Abercrombie store on Fifth Avenue, Manhattan
- Type: Public
- Traded as: NYSE: ANF (Class A); S&P 400 component
- Industry: Retail
- Founded: June 4, 1892; 134 years ago in Manhattan, New York City, U.S.
- Founders: David T. Abercrombie; Ezra Fitch
- Headquarters: New Albany, Ohio, U.S.
- Number of locations: 854 (Feb. 2020)
- Area served: Worldwide
- Key people: Nigel Travis (chairman); Fran Horowitz (CEO)
- Products: Apparel; Accessories; Personal care; Footwear
- Revenue: ▲US$5.27 billion (2025)
- Net income: ▼US$507 million (2025)
- Number of employees: 31,700 (Feb. 2024)
- Divisions: Abercrombie & Fitch; Abercrombie Kids; Hollister Co.; Gilly Hicks
- Website: abercrombie.com

Abercrombie & Fitch Co. (A&F) is an American lifestyle retailer founded in 1892, which focuses on contemporary clothing targeting customers in their early 20s to mid 40s. Headquartered in New Albany, Ohio, the company operates four offshoot brands: Abercrombie Kids, Your Personal Best, Hollister Co., and Gilly Hicks with 780+ company operated stores across its brands, as of Q4 2024.

As one of the oldest American clothing brands, the company originally marketed high-end outdoor clothing, but by the early 1980s it had almost entirely changed its direction. In the 1990s, under the leadership of CEO Mike Jeffries, Abercrombie & Fitch underwent a meteoric rise, focusing on "casual luxury" fashion and specifically "the good-looking, cool kids"—using sophisticated sexualized advertising, prominently of fashion models in revealing outfits.

The clothing company has since refocused itself successfully, targeting a more diverse range of customers in their early 20's to mid 40's.

== History ==
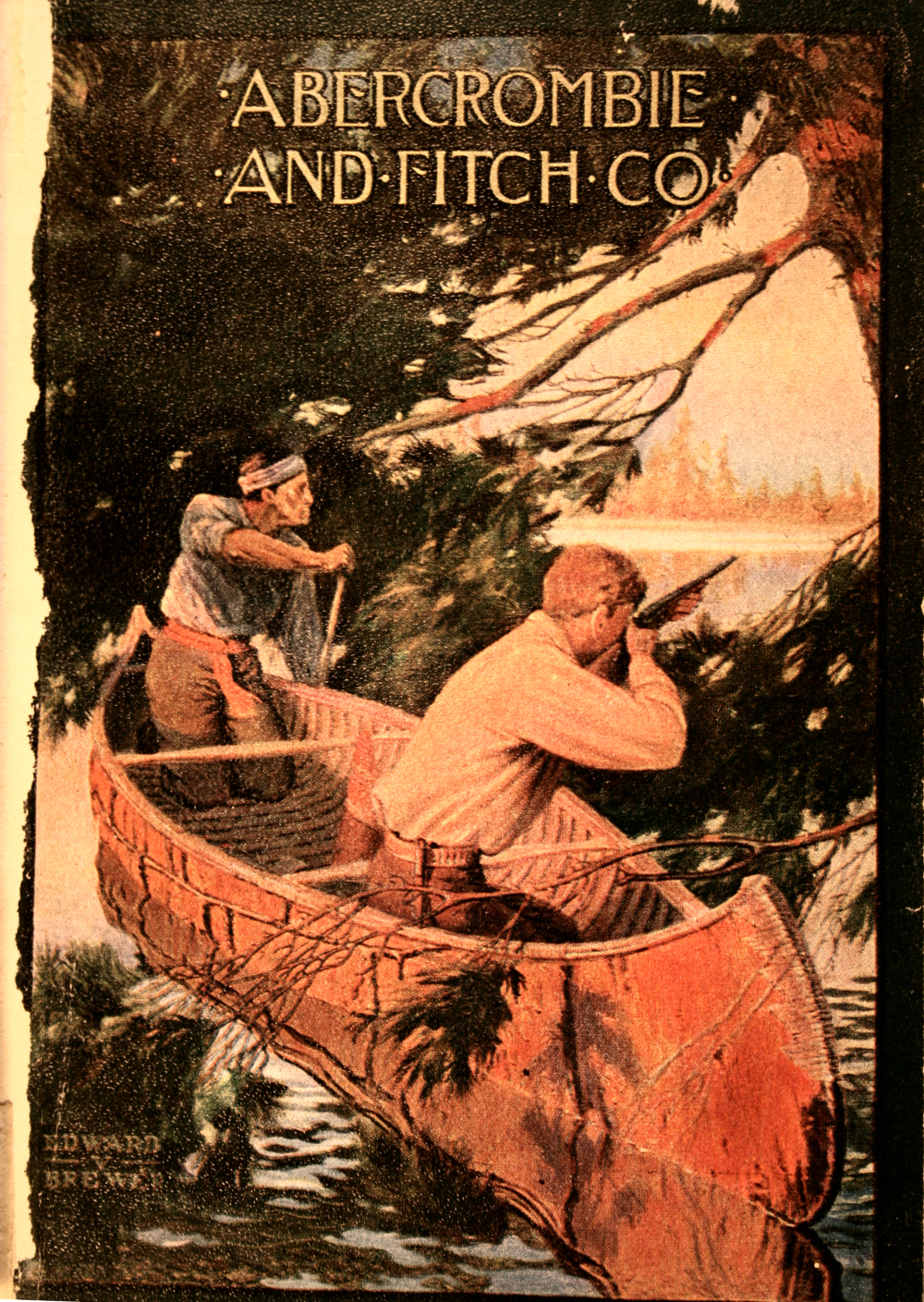
Cover of A&F catalog from 1909

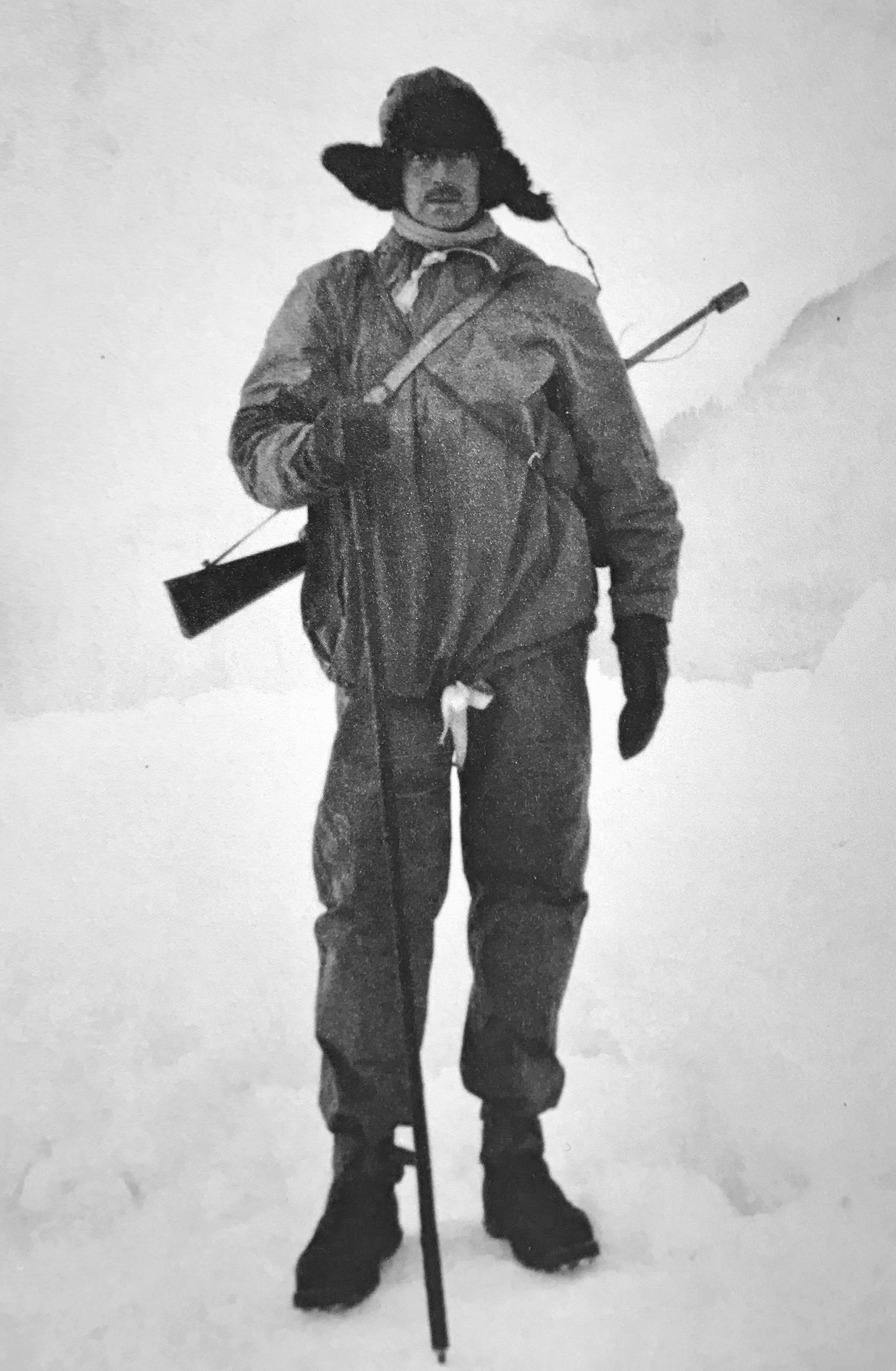
The Marquess of Camarasa wearing Abercrombie & Fitch hunting equipment in the Arctic Circle, 1921

The Abercrombie Company was founded in 1892 in New York City by David T. Abercrombie as an outfitter for the elite outdoorsman. Ezra Fitch—a wealthy lawyer, real estate developer, and devoted Abercrombie customer—bought a significant stake in the business in 1900. In 1904, it was incorporated and renamed Abercrombie & Fitch Co. Fitch eventually bought out Abercrombie's share of the business, becoming its sole owner from 1907 to 1928. The company was an elite outfitter of sporting and excursion goods, particularly noted for its expensive shotguns, fishing rods, fishing boats, and tents. It outfitted Theodore Roosevelt's safari and Admiral Richard E. Byrd's expedition to Antarctica. Ernest Hemingway was also a regular customer; the gun with which he committed suicide in 1961 was purchased from Abercrombie & Fitch. Following Hemingway's death, his wife placed several of his guns on consignment with the company.

By the 1970s, A&F was struggling to compete with lower-priced competitors while trying to maintain its high-end image. It was known for holding an extensive inventory of lavish items, but high operating expenses forced A&F to shed its highest priced items, such as an $18,000 (equivalent to $149,229 in 2025) gold and onyx chess set. Cash flow problems forced the company to also cut its inventory of moderately priced products.

In 1976, Abercrombie & Fitch filed for Chapter 11 bankruptcy protection. In 1977, the company closed its New York flagship store at Madison Avenue and East 45th Street.

While Abercrombie & Fitch went out of business during its bankruptcy, the brand survived: in 1978, Oshman's Sporting Goods, a Houston-based retail chain, bought the defunct firm's name and mailing list for $1.5 million (equivalent to $7 million in 2025). Oshman's relaunched the company as a mail-order retailer specializing in hunting wear and novelty items. Retail stores were also opened in Beverly Hills, Dallas, and (by the mid-1980s) New York City.

In 1988, Oshman's sold the brand and its operations to Les Wexner's vehicle The Limited (parent company of several retail clothing chains, including Victoria's Secret). Under The Limited, which later rebranded itself as L Brands, Abercrombie & Fitch gradually shifted its focus to young adults, hired Mike Jeffries in 1992, was in 1996 spun off as a separate, publicly traded company, and eventually grew into one of the largest and most popular apparel companies among teen consumers in the United States.

In 1998, the company launched a brand targeted towards children and pre-teens named "abercrombie" - the name was later changed to Abercrombie Kids. In 2000, Hollister was launched as the company's third brand, targeted at teenagers as "a new concept focused on the optimistic, laidback California lifestyle".

=== 2007–present ===
Following a lighter earnings announcement in August 2014, A&F shifted its business strategy a degree to trendier styles and faster production processes, effectively embracing fast fashion while retaining its upmarket prestige in contrast to its competitors. Longtime CEO Mike Jeffries resigned in December 2014, after 22 years with the company. Fran Horowitz took over as CEO in February 2017.

To further combat competition from more downscale fast-fashion rivals like Forever 21 and H&M, Abercrombie & Fitch announced more drastic changes to its image in 2015. It scrapped the brand's sexually charged style of advertising, changed the job title of store employees from "models" to "brand representatives", and allowed a less tightly controlled, more individualist dress code. Additionally, the company declared that "brand representatives" would focus more on customer service by offering to help serve customers, in comparison to the past reputation of displaying aloofness toward them. In 2015, the company signaled that it would begin implementing these changes.

By 2018, Abercrombie & Fitch had successfully shifted its target market to an older demographic.

=== Headquarters ===
The company's headquarters (a.k.a. "The Home Office") is located outside Columbus, Ohio in New Albany, Ohio, a small farm town that expanded into a wealthy community planned and developed by L Brands founder Les Wexner. The Home Office was designed by Anderson Architects as a campus and internally referred to as such, sitting on 350-acres and consisting of 11 two-story buildings (some connected by skybridge). The company's two merchandise distribution centers (1 million square feet each) are located on campus to help ensure brand protection. Also on campus are model stores, one for each of the company's brands, where store layouts, merchandising and atmosphere are developed and tested. In January 2017, A&F announced it was terminating 150 Home Office employees.

The company also has a EMEA Home Office in London and a APAC Home Office in Shanghai.

== Marketing, advertising and brand identity ==
The previous trademark slogan, Casual Luxury

Abercrombie & Fitch was once known for its sophisticated racy marketing photography by Bruce Weber. Photos were mostly black and white and set outdoors, usually with partially nude males and females for an increased tone of sexuality. The company promoted its casting sessions, models, and photo shoots in the "A&F Casting" feature on its website. The brand was also notable for utilising partially nude men and women as store greeters in the 2000s and early 2010s. Echoing the entertainment-based, high-class-aspirational approach L Brands' Les Wexner used to fuel the 1980s-2010s growth of Victoria's Secret, Abercrombie & Fitch CEO Mike Jeffries called A&F's previous brand image a "movie" because of the "fantasy" that plays out in-store.

The company's previous brand image was heavily promoted as an international casual luxury lifestyle brand. The company began cultivating a far more upscale image after the 2005 opening of its Fifth Avenue flagship store alongside Prada and other premium retailers. Having for years used high-grade materials in the manufacture of its merchandise, and pricing them at "near-luxury" levels, the company introduced the trademark Casual Luxury as a fictional dictionary term with multiple definitions such as "[using] the finest cashmere, pima cotton, and highest quality leather to create the ultimate in casual, body conscious clothing," and "implementing and/or incorporating time honored machinery ...to produce the most exclusive denim..." This upscale image allowed Abercrombie & Fitch to open stores in international high-end locations and reaffirm its premium brand positioning by pricing its merchandise at almost double the American prices.

In 2026, Abercrombie & Fitch partnered with the National Football League and became its first official fashion partner.

=== Products ===
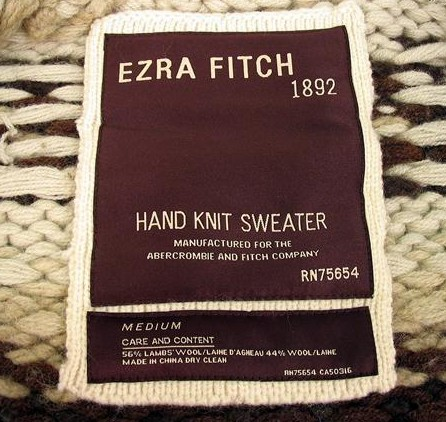
High-end "Ezra Fitch" clothing marker

Women's Wear Daily called the company's clothing classically "neo-preppy", with an "edgy tone and imagery". In the 2000s and early 2010s, the prices of Abercrombie & Fitch apparel were recognized as the highest in the youth-clothing industry. When the late-2000s recession hit, the company took a major hit financially for its refusal to lower prices or offer discounts. It argued that doing so would "cheapen" its near-luxury image. The company's year-to-year revenue, a key indicator of a retailer's health, rose 13% in September 2010.

The company has carried several popular men's fragrances including Fierce, which was previously the brand's signature scent and was heavily sprayed in all Abercrombie & Fitch stores as a way to experiment with sensory marketing.

==== Product criticism ====
In 2002, the company sold a shirt featuring the slogan "Wong Brothers Laundry Service – Two Wongs Can Make It White," with smiling figures in conical Asian hats, an offensive depiction of 19th century Chinese immigrants to the U.S. Abercrombie & Fitch discontinued the designs and apologized after a boycott started by a Stanford University Asian American student group. That same year, Abercrombie removed a line of thong underwear sold for young girls after parents led nationwide storefront protests. The underwear included phrases like "Eye Candy" and "Wink Wink" printed on the front.

More T-shirt controversies occurred in 2004. The first incident involved a shirt featuring the phrase, "It's All Relative in West Virginia," playing on the trope that incestuous relationships are supposedly common in rural America. West Virginia Governor Bob Wise spoke out against the company for depicting "an unfounded, negative stereotype of West Virginia", but Abercrombie & Fitch did not remove the shirts. Later, another T-shirt that read "L is for Loser" next to a picture of a male gymnast (implying that male participation in female-dominated sporting activities makes such males less "masculine") gathered publicity. Abercrombie & Fitch stopped selling the shirt in October 2004 after USA Gymnastics president Bob Colarossi announced a boycott for mocking the sport.

In 2005, the Women and Girls Foundation of Southwest Pennsylvania launched a "Girlcott" of the brand to protest the sale of T-shirts displaying messages such as "Who needs brains when you have these?" ("these" meaning breasts), "Available for parties," and "I had a nightmare I was a brunette." The campaign received national coverage on The Today Show, and the company pulled the shirts from stores on November 5, 2005. Five days after this media coverage, the company pulled two of the shirts from its shelves, released an apology to girls for producing the T-shirts, and agreed to have corporate executives meet with the "Girlcott" girls at the company's headquarters.

Another T-shirt controversy arose over the company's Back-to-School 2009 collection of "humor tees". One shirt proclaims "Show the twins" above a picture of a young woman with her blouse open to two men. Two other shirts state "Female streaking encouraged" and "Female Students Wanted for Sexual Research". The American Family Association disapproved of the influence of the "sex-as-recreation" lifestyle shirts, and asked the brand to remove its "sexualized shirts" from display. Abercrombie & Fitch did not comply.

=== Brand protection ===
Because of extensive counterfeiting of its products, the company launched a brand protection program in 2006 to combat the problem by working with law enforcement globally. The company stated that the program would "improve current practices and strategies by focusing on eliminating the supply of illicit Abercrombie & Fitch products."

In August 2011, the company offered Mike "The Situation" Sorrentino and other cast members of the MTV reality show Jersey Shore a "substantial payment" if they stopped wearing Abercrombie-branded clothes, stating "We are deeply concerned that Mr. Sorrentino's association with our brand could cause significant damage to our image." In November 2011, Sorrentino filed a lawsuit against the company after it allegedly violated his copyrights in making shirts that said "The Fitchuation" and "GTL...You Know The Deal". The case was dismissed in July 2013.

=== Jeffries' 2006 target demographic quote ===
In 2013, a 2006 Salon interview with then-CEO Mike Jeffries went viral, causing public backlash against Abercrombie & Fitch's marketing practices.

That's why we hire good-looking people in our stores. Because good-looking people attract other good-looking people, and we want to market to cool, good-looking people. We don't market to anyone other than that. ... In every school there are the cool and popular kids, and then there are the not-so-cool kids. Candidly, we go after the cool kids. We go after the attractive all-American kid with a great attitude and a lot of friends. A lot of people don't belong [in our clothes], and they can't belong. Are we exclusionary? Absolutely.

These quotes, which were the basis for the article's "youth, sex and casual superiority" headline, went largely unnoticed when the article was published in 2006, until they resurfaced in May 2013 after actor Kirstie Alley brought them up in an Entertainment Tonight interview, and prominent daytime talk-show host Ellen DeGeneres spoke out against the company.

Jeffries issued an official statement on May 17, 2013, regarding the news articles, saying, "I want to address some of my comments that have been circulating from a 2006 interview. While I believe this seven-year-old, resurrected quote has been taken out of context, I sincerely regret that my choice of words was interpreted in a manner that has offended." He also stated, "We are completely opposed to any discrimination, bullying, derogatory characterizations or other anti-social behavior based on race, gender, body type or other individual characteristics."

== Stores ==
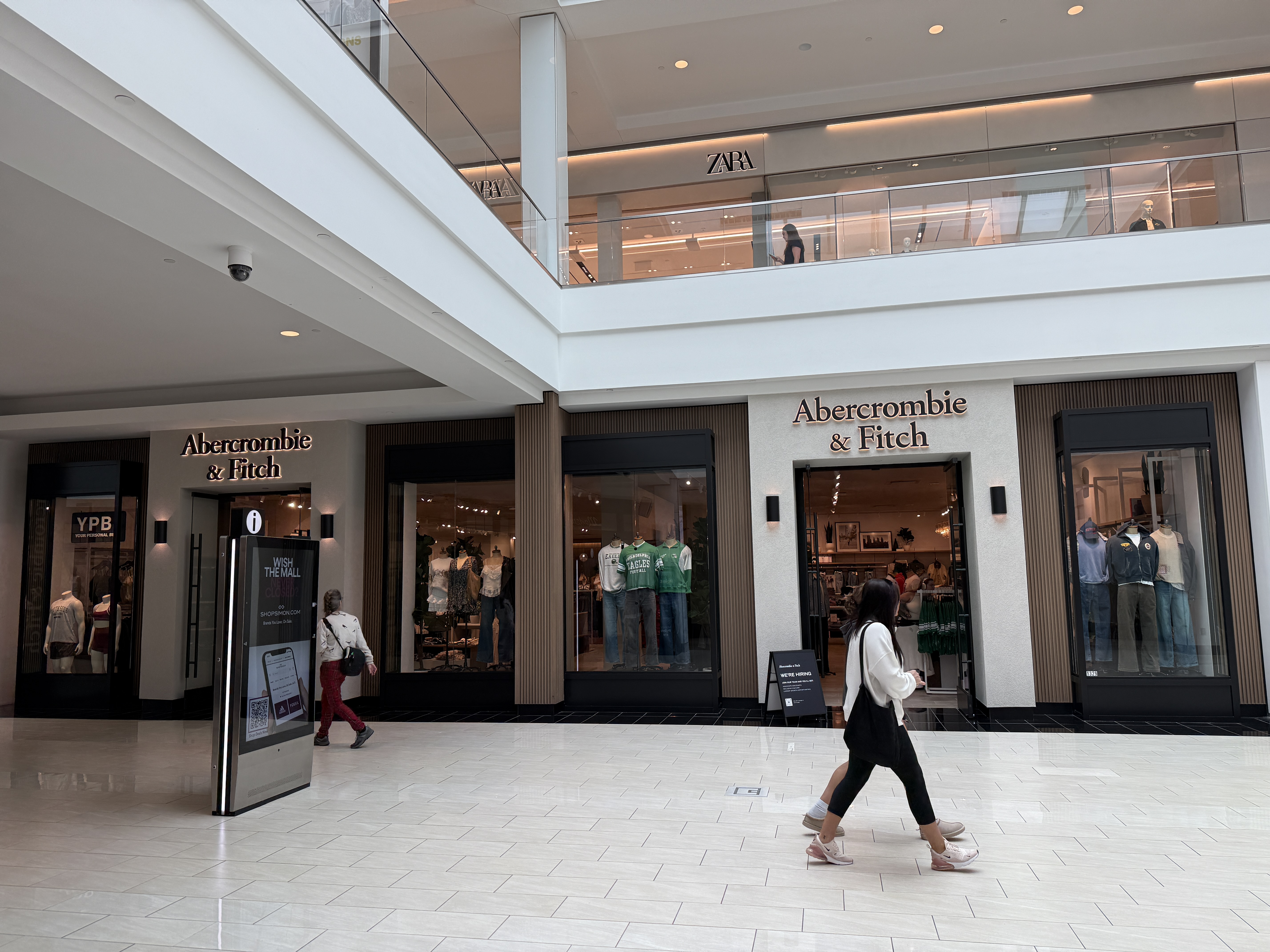
Modern Abercrombie & Fitch store located at the King of Prussia Mall in King of Prussia, Pennsylvania

The current design of Abercrombie & Fitch stores feature white or wood exterior molding, bright lighting, and open windows. Previously, most store entrances featured a prominent marketing image, usually of partially nude men, directly facing the entrance. The interiors were lit with dim ceiling lights and spot lighting, with electronic dance music played at sound levels as high as 90 decibels. Windows were covered with black louvers to create a brooding atmosphere from outside, and the company's signature fragrance Fierce would be sprayed at high levels. Exclusive to all flagship stores were a dark red, brown, and black color scheme, illuminated staircases, art depicting nude men on all walls, and elevators. From 2013 to 2014, the louvers were removed from all locations except from certain flagship stores which had windows above street level. The company stated that the louvers were removed in an effort to experiment with window marketing.

The company operates 854 stores across all four brands. The company's brand has 278 locations in the United States, 5 in Canada (2 in Alberta, 2 in Ontario, and 1 in British Columbia). The company currently operates 70 full-line stores abroad and 10 outlet stores across 16 countries.

=== International expansion ===
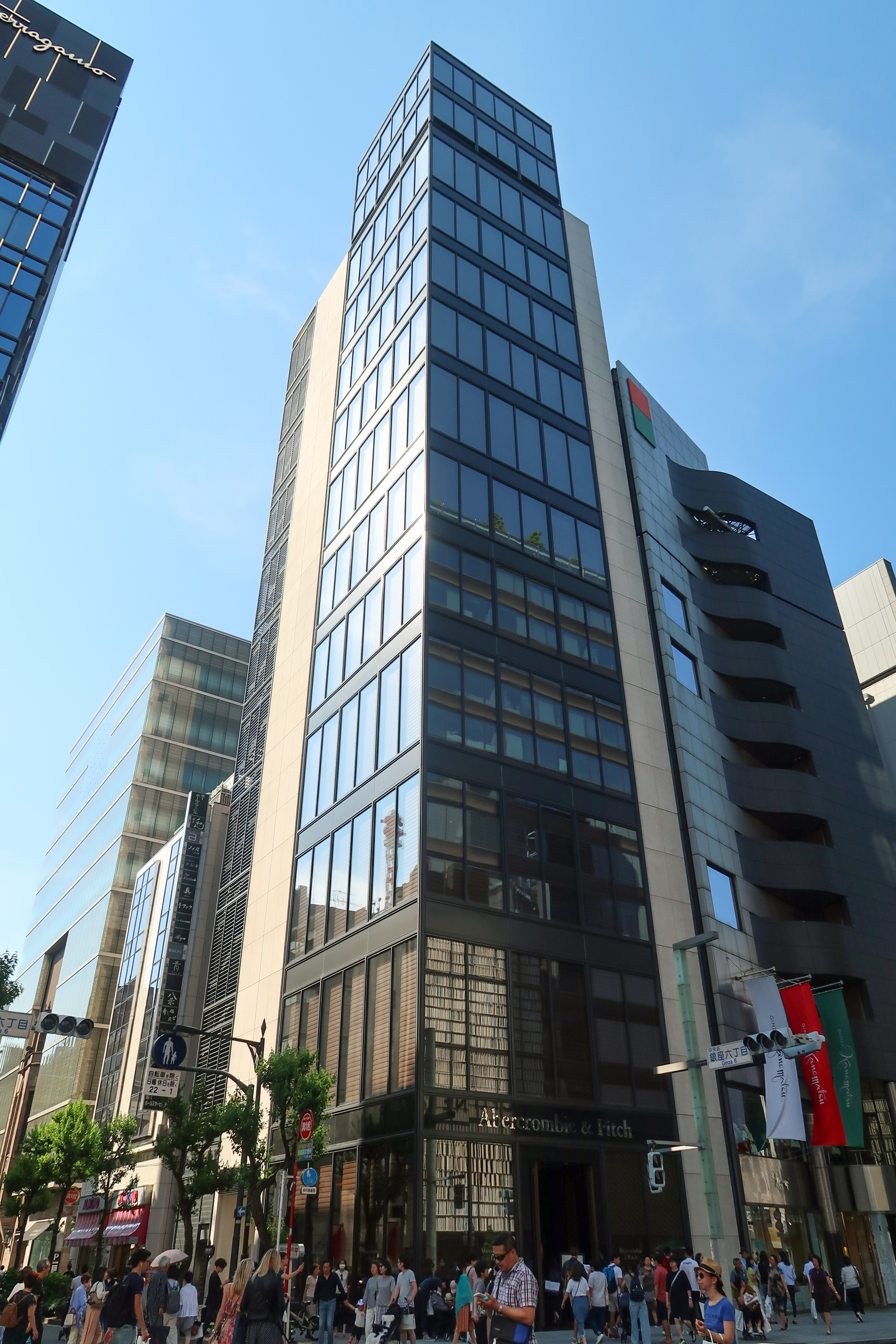
The Abercrombie & Fitch flagship store in Ginza, Tokyo, Japan – the first one in Asia (2018)

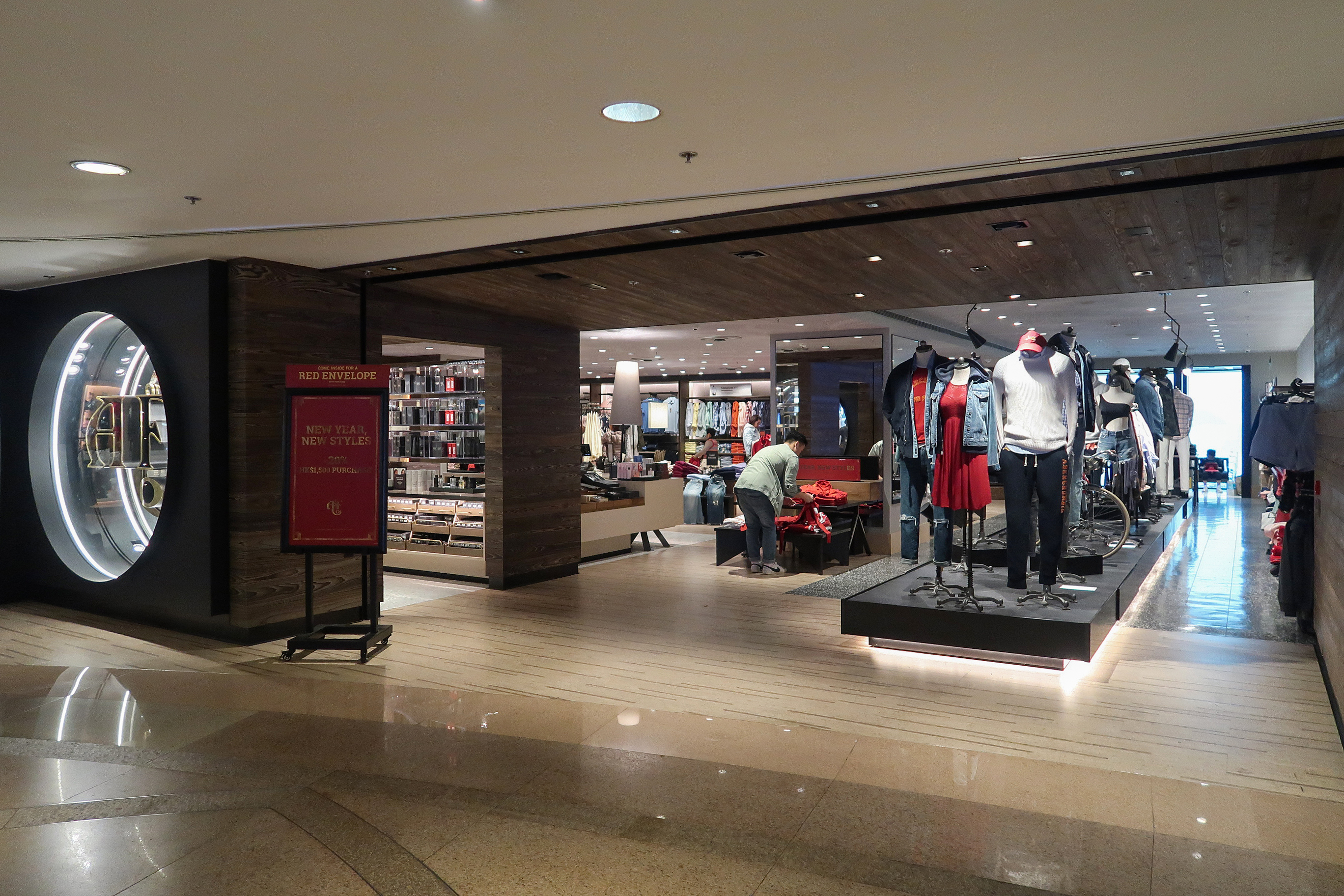
The Abercrombie & Fitch store in Hong Kong (2018)

Abercrombie & Fitch was believed to have reached its maximum growth potential in the American market by the early 2000s. International expansion began in 2005, with the long-term goal of opening and maintaining flagships for the company in high-profile locations worldwide "at a deliberate pace". After initially opening at a deliberately slow pace, the company began to accelerate international expansion for its namesake and its Hollister Co. brand in 2012.

The company's first non-U.S. stores opened in Toronto and Edmonton in 2005, and then expanded to other major cities in Canada. The company first entered the European market in 2007 with the opening of its flagship London store at 7 Burlington Gardens, Savile Row. The company went on to open flagship stores in Milan, Copenhagen, Paris, Madrid, Brussels, Dublin and other major cities in Europe, including six stores in Germany. The company opened its first Asian flagship store in Tokyo in 2009, followed by Fukuoka, Singapore, Hong Kong and Seoul. In 2015, the company entered the Middle Eastern market with the opening of its flagship store in Kuwait. Since then the company has opened locations in Dubai and plans to expand deeper into the Middle East with stores in Saudi Arabia, Qatar, Bahrain, and Oman. By the 2020s, the majority of Abercrombie & Fitch's international stores were closed as part of a strategy shift from large flagship stores to focusing on e-commerce.

==== Remembrance poppy prohibition in the UK ====
In November 2010, the Southampton, England, store prevented 18-year-old Harriet Phipps from wearing a remembrance poppy, which is worn as part of the Remembrance Day commemorations in the United Kingdom and Canada every November. The official reason for the refusal was reported to be that the poppy is not considered part of the corporate approved uniform, and is therefore prohibited. The ban drew criticisms, and on November 8 the company posted on its Facebook page the following statement: "As an American company that has been around since 1892, we appreciate the sacrifices of the British and American servicemen/women in the World Wars and in military conflicts that continue today. Our company policy is to allow associates to wear a poppy as a token of this appreciation on Remembrance Day. Going forward, ...we will revisit this policy to the days/weeks leading up to Remembrance Day."

=== Abercrombie Kids shop on Savile Row ===
In 2012, the company announced plans to open an Abercrombie Kids store at No. 3 on Savile Row, next door to Gieves & Hawkes. The plans drew widespread criticism and opposition from the tailors of the Row, who were already unhappy about the presence of the company's main store on Burlington Gardens at the end of the Row. This eventually led to a protest organized by The Chap magazine on April 23, 2012. During the consultation period, objections were lodged to Westminster City Council and in February 2013 the Council rejected many of the company's proposals for the store, and branded the entire plans "utterly unacceptable." A&F appealed, won, and opened the store in September 2014. The following year, the company was subject to nearly £16,000 in fines and legal costs when it was ruled that changes it had made in the Grade II-listed building were illegal.

=== Abercrombie opens college campus stores ===
In an attempt to more effectively reach the brand's ideal "college-age" customer, the company tested two experimental campus stores in August 2018, both of which have since closed.

== Brands ==
The company has operated four concept brands apart from its namesake over the years; they have been referred to as subsidiaries, but operate as divisions under the company's umbrella.

Abercrombie Kids
Prep-school by Abercrombie & Fitch Themed as "classic cool" for kids 7 through 14, this is the children's version of Abercrombie & Fitch.

Hollister Co.
Southern California by Abercrombie & Fitch Themed after "SoCal" for teenagers 14 through 18, with significantly lower prices than its parent brand.

Gilly Hicks
The cheeky cousin of Abercrombie & Fitch Themed after "Down Under" Sydney, offers underwear, loungewear and activewear for women 18 and up. Currently sold primarily within Hollister Co. stores and e-commerce channels with a small number of individual store locations.

Ruehl No.925
Post-Grad by Abercrombie & Fitch Themed after a fictional Greenwich Village heritage, offered clothes for 22 through 35 post-grads. Closed in 2010.

== Legal issues ==
The company has been involved in legal conflicts over its employment practices, rape and exploitation of employees, treatment of customers, and clothing styles.

=== Employment practices ===
In a 2004 lawsuit González v. Abercrombie & Fitch, the company was accused of discriminating against African Americans, Latinos, Asian Americans, and women by preferentially offering floor sales positions (called Brand Representatives before the settlement and Models after) and store management positions to Caucasian males. The company agreed to a settlement of the class-action suit, which required the company to (1) pay $40 million to African Americans, Latinos, Asian Americans, and women who applied and were not hired or worked in certain store positions, (2) revise its hiring, performance measurement, and promotion policies, (3) revise its internal complaint procedures, (4) appoint a Vice President of Diversity, (5) hire 25 recruiters to seek out minority applicants, (6) discontinue the practice of recruiting employees at primarily white fraternities and sororities, (7) include more minorities in marketing materials, (8) report to a neutral court-appointed monitor twice per year regarding its progress in those areas, and (9) report to the court once per year.

In June 2009, British law student Riam Dean, who had worked at the company's flagship store in London's Savile Row, took the company to an employment tribunal. Dean, who was born without a left forearm, claimed that although she was initially given special permission to wear clothing that covered her prosthetic limb, she was soon told that her appearance breached the company's "Look Policy" and sent to work in the stockroom, out of sight of customers. Dean sued the company for disability discrimination, and sought up to £20,000 in damages. In August 2009, the tribunal ruled the 22-year-old was wrongfully dismissed and unlawfully harassed. She was awarded £8,013 for loss of earnings and wrongful dismissal.

In a lawsuit filed in September 2009, Equal Employment Opportunity Commission v. Abercrombie & Fitch Stores, in U.S. District Court by the U.S. Equal Employment Opportunity Commission, 17-year-old Samantha Elauf said she applied, in June 2008, for a sales position at the Abercrombie Kids store in the Woodland Hills Mall, located in Tulsa, Oklahoma. The teenager, who wears a hijab in accordance with her religious beliefs, claims the manager told her the headscarf violates the store's "Look Policy". The United States Supreme Court agreed to hear the case on February 25, 2015, and ruled 8–1 on June 1, 2015, against the company.

In 2010, a Muslim woman working at a Hollister store in San Mateo, California, was fired. Before being dismissed, Hani Khan had refused Abercrombie & Fitch's human-resources representative's demand that she remove her hijab. The representative reportedly stated that the headscarf, which Khan wears for religious reasons, violated the company's "Look Policy". The Council on American-Islamic Relations has stated that the dismissal is a violation of non-discrimination laws, and filed a complaint with the U.S. Equal Employment Opportunity Commission.

In 2011, the Belgian Centre for Equal Opportunities and Opposition to Racism started an investigation into the company's hiring and remuneration policies. The firm was suspected of only hiring personnel under 25 years old, making heavy demands on the physical appearance of its staff and rewarding a premium to male models that work shirtless.

In November 2009, the company was added to the "Sweatshop Hall of Shame 2010" by the worker advocacy group International Labor Rights Forum.

=== Customer issues ===
In 2009, the company was fined more than $115,000 by the Minnesota Department of Human Rights for refusing to let a teenage girl help her sister, who has autism, try on clothes in a fitting room. The amount of the fine reflected "pushback" by the company according to Michael K. Browne, the legal affairs manager of the Minnesota Department of Human Rights.

A 16-year-old sued the company after discovering that she was being videotaped in a changing room by an employee, Kenneth Applegate II. Applegate denied the claim, but co-workers discovered his camera days later with the video on it.

In 2010, a customer filed a class action relating to a 2009 holiday gift card promotion. The lawsuit alleges that the gift cards said "No Expiration Date" but Abercrombie voided and expired the gift cards in early 2010. In 2012, a judge certified a nationwide class in the case. In May 2013, Class Notice went out to potential a class members. The company settled the case in 2016.

=== Lawsuits against other parties ===
In 2002, the company filed a lawsuit against American Eagle Outfitters, claiming that American Eagle copied the company's garment designs, among other things. The lawsuit was based on a trade-dress claim, stating that American Eagle had very closely mimicked the company's products' visual appearance and packaging. Specifically, it claimed that American Eagle copied particular articles of clothing, in-store displays and advertisements, and even its product catalog. Despite the admission that American Eagle might have utilized very similar materials, designs, in-store displays, symbols, color combinations, and patterns as A&F, the court ruled that there was not an excessive level of similarity to confuse potential customers, and therefore the court ruled in favor of American Eagle.

On October 18, 1999, the company had a lawsuit about making false and misleading statements concerning its growth while knowing the actual growth was less than Wall Street expectations, and paid $6,050,000 for settlement.

=== Mike Jeffries ===
During Mike Jeffries' tenure as CEO of Abercrombie & Fitch from 1992 to 2014, the company became synonymous with a hypersexualized and exclusionary brand image. Jeffries' marketing strategies, which emphasized "cool" and attractive youth, encouraged a corporate culture that has since been scrutinized for fostering discriminatory hiring practices and a sexually charged environment.

In 2023, allegations surfaced accusing Jeffries and his partner, Matthew Smith, of orchestrating an international sex trafficking ring between 2008 and 2015. The scheme reportedly involved luring young men, some of whom were Abercrombie employees or aspiring models, with promises of modeling opportunities, only to coerce them into sexual acts. Recruitment efforts allegedly utilized Abercrombie & Fitch email addresses, suggesting a potential overlap between the illicit activities and the company's operations.

Abercrombie & Fitch has publicly expressed being "horrified and disgusted" by the allegations against its former CEO and has stated that it had no knowledge of the alleged misconduct during Jeffries' leadership.

== See also ==
- Companies listed on the New York Stock Exchange (A)
- List of S&P 600 companies
- Lifestyle brand
- List of retailers affected by the retail apocalypse
- Retail apocalypse
