= Mike Jeffries (businessman) =

American businessman

- Born: Michael Stanton Jeffries; 1943 or 1944 (age 82–83)
- Education: Claremont Men's College (BA); Columbia University (MBA)
- Occupation: Businessman
- Known for: Former chairman and CEO of Abercrombie & Fitch
- Spouse: Susan Hansen (m. 1971, separated)
- Partner: Matthew Smith
- Children: 1

Michael Stanton Jeffries (born 1943 or 1944) is an American retired businessman who was chairman and CEO of clothing retailer Abercrombie & Fitch from 1992 to 2014. During Jeffries' tenure, he engineered a turnaround of Abercrombie & Fitch from a "fashion backwater" losing $25 million yearly to a lifestyle brand grossing $2 billion yearly by 2006, though this approach courted controversy with the advertising of semi-nude models, racially and sexually insensitive slogans, and the stance of marketing to "cool kids". Jeffries resigned from Abercrombie & Fitch in 2014 after an extended period of poor company performance.

In 2023, Jeffries was named in a civil class-action lawsuit which alleged that during his tenure as CEO of the company, he engaged in sex trafficking with over 100 young men, in exchange for promises of employment for coveted modeling spots, money, and drugs. In October 2024, in a separate case, Jeffries was arrested and indicted by federal prosecutors on criminal charges of sex trafficking and interstate prostitution.

== Early life ==
Jeffries grew up in Los Angeles, the son of Donald R. Jeffries, who owned a chain of party supply stores. He earned a Bachelor of Arts degree from Claremont Men's College in 1966, and after a stint at the London School of Economics, he received a Master of Business Administration degree from Columbia University in 1968.

== Career ==
=== Early career ===
In 1968, Jeffries joined the management training program at Abraham & Straus, a Brooklyn department store which was owned by the umbrella corporation Federated Department Stores, which was rebranded Macy's in 1994 after that property was acquired by Federated. He worked for 12 years at Abraham & Straus, before moving to Bullock's in Los Angeles, owned by Federated, as executive vice president for merchandising. He then worked for three years at Federated headquarters in Cincinnati, Ohio.

In 1984, Jeffries founded Alcott & Andrews, a brand targeted at career women. The store went bankrupt in 1989 due to over-expansion and closed, with the New York Times noting that the store offered "too little variety in its merchandise."

After the Alcott & Andrews bankruptcy in late 1989, Jeffries worked in merchandising at Paul Harris, a Midwest clothing chain that also went bankrupt, in early 1991.

=== Abercrombie & Fitch Co. ===
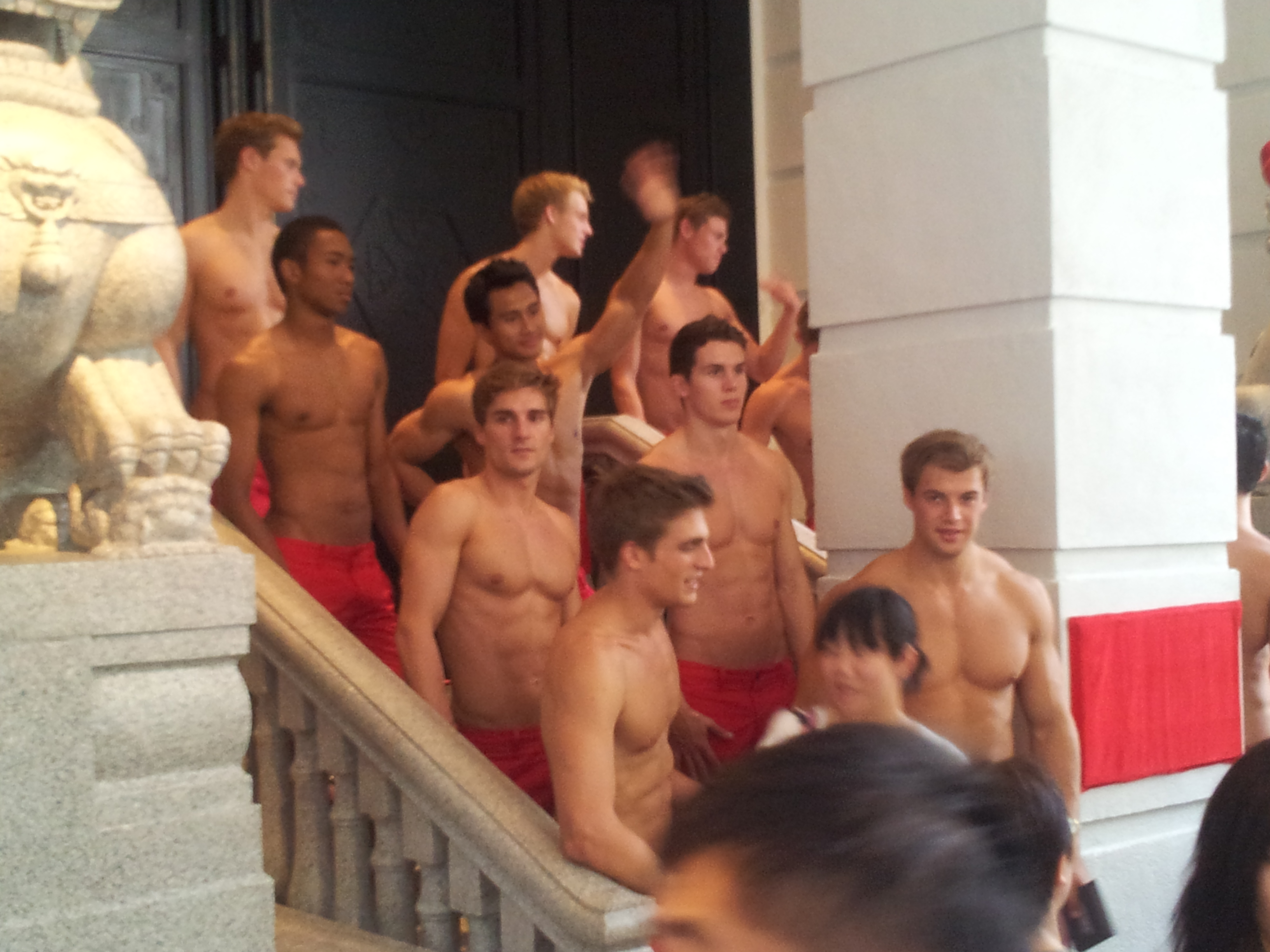
A&F's "Models" opening a new store in 2012. Photo demonstrates the shirtless male hunk that characterized the store's "sexualized marketing" during Jeffries 22-year reign. "The marketing approach that made A&F into a financial success also made it an HR and PR nightmare".

Jeffries ran Abercrombie & Fitch from 1992 to 2014 as CEO and chairman. During that period, he completely changed the brand, image and focus of the company. Jeffries' moves proved successful during the 1990s and early 2000s, but were not without controversy. After a string of poor results from the 2008 financial crisis onwards, as well as criticism related to the brand he created, he stepped down in 2014.

Jeffries was hired in 1992 by Les Wexner (CEO of LBrands, then named The Limited) to invigorate Abercrombie & Fitch. The company, founded in 1892, had been purchased by Limited Brands in 1988 after bankruptcy.

Jeffries was the main architect of the company's new brand. It was rebuilt as an upscale apparel retailer for the collegiate. He built the brand around "sexualized marketing", which included using shirtless muscular male models to greet patrons in stores, and likewise using scantily-clad male models posing in sexually-suggestive positions in large advertisements and billboards. Jeffries created a cult following among young buyers. By the mid-1990s, Abercrombie & Fitch had opened dozens of new stores globally. "Abercrombie led the pack of teen fashion brands in the 1990s largely as a result of the image created by Mr. Jeffries", according to the Wall Street Journal.

An outspoken businessman, Jeffries made statements in the press that were controversial. For example, he once said, "We hire good-looking people in our stores. Because good-looking people attract other good-looking people, and we want to market to cool, good-looking people. We don't market to anyone other than that." In a 2006 interview with Salon, Jeffries stated that A&F's clothing line was exclusively for "cool" people. Moreover, he has said he did not want overweight or unattractive people to wear their clothes. Jeffries justified his approach, saying "those companies that are in trouble are trying to target everybody: young, old, fat, skinny. But then you become totally vanilla. You don't alienate anybody, but you don't excite anybody, either." The comments, which came to light in 2013, drew negative publicity and criticism for the company. Jeffries issued a public apology on May 15, 2013, stating that "We are completely opposed to any discrimination, bullying, derogatory characterizations or other anti-social behavior based on race, gender, body type or other individual characteristics".

The "marketing approach that made A&F into a financial success also made it an HR and PR nightmare". A&F was criticized by the feminist movement and the American Decency Association, and a number of lawsuits ensued. In 2003, Black, Latino and Asian American employees filed a class action lawsuit against the company claiming that minority applicants were discouraged from applying. The American Decency Association called for a boycott of A&F. A group of Pennsylvania high schoolers called for a "girlcott" of the brand.

In 2004, Jeffries earned approximately US$25 million with a "stay bonus" of $6 million, which dropped from $12 million after complaints about his "excessive compensation". After surveying 2,000 US corporations, the Corporate Library named Jeffries as the "Highest Paid Worst Performer" of 2008, after he received a compensation package valued at $71.8 million. Jeffries refused to lower prices or offer discounts at Abercrombie & Fitch stores during the retail recession of the 2008 financial crisis, until September 2009, after the company posted same store sales losses for 17 consecutive months. Sales recovered in 2011. As of 2012, Jeffries owned about 2.9% of the company's shares, making him difficult to remove without his consent. At that time, his contract entitled him to over $100 million should he lose his job due to an ownership change. Jeffries was once one of the best-paid CEOs in retail but his compensation shrank 72 percent in 2013. His total pay was $2.24 million in the fiscal year of 2013, which ended February 1. That was down from $8.16 million in the previous year and $48.1 million before that.

In October 2012, Bloomberg News first reported on Jeffries' standards for his cabin crew on Abercrombie's Gulfstream G-V Jet, used by Jeffries, Smith and their dogs. The male models who work as stewards aboard the company jet were required to wear Abercrombie-branded polos, jeans, boxer briefs and flip-flops as part of their uniform, as well as a "spritz" of cologne. This information then came to light as a result of a lawsuit that claimed Jeffries fired his own jet pilot in order to replace him with a much younger man. The suit was quickly settled out of court when Jeffries was ordered to testify by the presiding judge. Male house staff for Jeffries, paid for by the Jeffries Family Office, were provided by the same modeling firm that supplies male staff for the company jet.

Jeffries' business reputation sank in 2013, when TheStreet's Herb Greenberg named Jeffries the worst CEO of 2013. Greenberg pointed out that the share price for A&F had collapsed by 40% during the year. This was after Jim Cramer of CNBC had earlier named Jeffries to his "Wall of Shame".

Jeffries’ romantic partner, Matthew Smith, reviewed internal documents and advised Abercrombie & Fitch on real estate matters despite lacking relevant professional qualifications and holding no official position within the company. Smith’s involvement drew criticism over corporate governance concerns and according to GQ, likely contributed to Jeffries’ decision to leave the company.

On December 9, 2014, Jeffries stepped down as A&F CEO amid criticism of the company's performance and 11 consecutive quarters of negative company comparable-store sales. The shares jumped 8 percent after the move was announced, marking the biggest one-day gain in more than nine months. On top of his standard pension, Jeffries received lifetime bonus payments totaling about $1m a year. Following allegations of sex trafficking in late 2023, the company stopped making the bonus payments.

In 2022, Jeffries' leadership of A&F was the subject of a Netflix documentary, White Hot: The Rise & Fall of Abercrombie & Fitch, which focused on Jeffries' transformation of A&F into an "avatar of exclusivity and soft-core sex appeal." The film's focus is the buildup to a 2023 class-action lawsuit against the company.

== Personal life ==
In 1971, Jeffries married Susan Hansen. They have a son.

Salon.com reported in 2006 that Jeffries is a "gay man" who lives separately from his wife. As of 2013, Jeffries was reported to be living with his partner, Matthew Smith (born c. 1962–63), who also headed the Jeffries Family Office, an Ohio limited liability company that "advocates for the personal interests of Jeffries." Smith also reviewed internal documents and consulted on real estate matters at Abercrombie & Fitch.

== Sex trafficking investigation, lawsuit and indictment ==
In 2023, the BBC completed a two-year investigation into several allegations that Jeffries and his cohorts exploited young adult men for sex. The events allegedly occurred in Jeffries's New York residences and at luxury hotels around the world.

In October, a few weeks after the BBC report, Jeffries and others were sued in New York by a former model under a civil class action complaint of sex trafficking. The former model alleged that Jeffries and his partner Matthew Smith would search for attractive men on the Internet; provide them with money, drugs and promises of recruitment; and sexually exploit them. It was alleged that Jeffries and Smith made it explicitly clear that sexual activity was the price for attaining coveted jobs. The lawsuit estimates that over a hundred young models were victimized. Jeffries, Smith, and the Jeffries Family Office are named in the suit.

On October 22, 2024, Jeffries and Smith were indicted by federal prosecutors in the United States District Court for the Eastern District of New York, on criminal charges of sex trafficking and interstate prostitution. The federal criminal indictment is separate from the civil class-action lawsuit filed in October 2023. Jeffries was released on $10 million bail with his house as collateral and must wear a GPS monitor. He pleaded not guilty at an October 25 arraignment.

On April 10, 2025, prosecutors and defense attorneys filed a motion stating Jeffries suffered from incurable dementia and that doctors had determined he had Alzheimer's disease, Lewy Body disease and the residual effects of a traumatic brain injury requiring around-the-clock care and thus was not competent to stand trial. The judge accepted this motion on May 2, 2025, stating that the defendant was "suffering from a mental disease or defect", making him "unable to understand" court proceedings and that as such Jeffries would be treated in hospital at the Federal Medical Center, Butner, for up to four months to see if he is likely to regain competency. Once a follow-up assessment is complete, the defendant could face trial or the court could decide to drop the charges against him or release him to home confinement. He was released from custody in November 2025.

On December 10, 2025, prosecutors sent a letter to the court from the warden at FMC Butner, saying that Jeffries had been re-assessed after treatment and was now fit to stand trial. Judge Nusrat Jahan Choudhury ordered a hearing for March 2026 to assess Jeffries's competence. On August 20, 2026, Choudhury ruled that Jeffries is competent to stand trial.
