= Abercrombie Kids =

Children's clothing brand

- Type: Division
- Industry: Retail
- Founded: July 1998; 28 years ago
- Headquarters: New Albany, Ohio, U.S.
- Number of locations: 160
- Area served: International
- Revenue: ▲US$ 382.579 million (2010)
- Parent: Abercrombie & Fitch
- Website: www.abercrombiekids.com

Abercrombie Kids is a children's clothing brand owned by Abercrombie & Fitch, introduced in 1998. Originally targeting high school consumers aged 13–18 as "abercrombie" its focus has shifted to the 7–14 market as "abercrombie kids", the concept is designed as the children's version of its parent company A&F. There are 122 full-price abercrombie kids stores in the US, Canada, Germany, Italy, the Netherlands, and the United Kingdom; including standalone retail stores and "carve-outs" in larger Abercrombie & Fitch locations.

== History ==
Abercrombie & Fitch introduced "abercrombie" in 1998 with 9 stores. The purpose was to attract a younger audience to the adult Abercrombie brand. The name of the concept took the same font of its parent, but with a navy color. The abbreviation from "Abercrombie & Fitch" to "abercrombie" with lowercase letters was intended to provide a younger image. The store prototype was as the A&F one, but with variations also intended to appeal to the younger audience. Early abercrombie models include Ronnie Smith, Cassie Ventura, Christina Akatsuka, Christian Valentin, Lindsay Lohan, and model Karlie Kloss.

== Stores and expansion ==
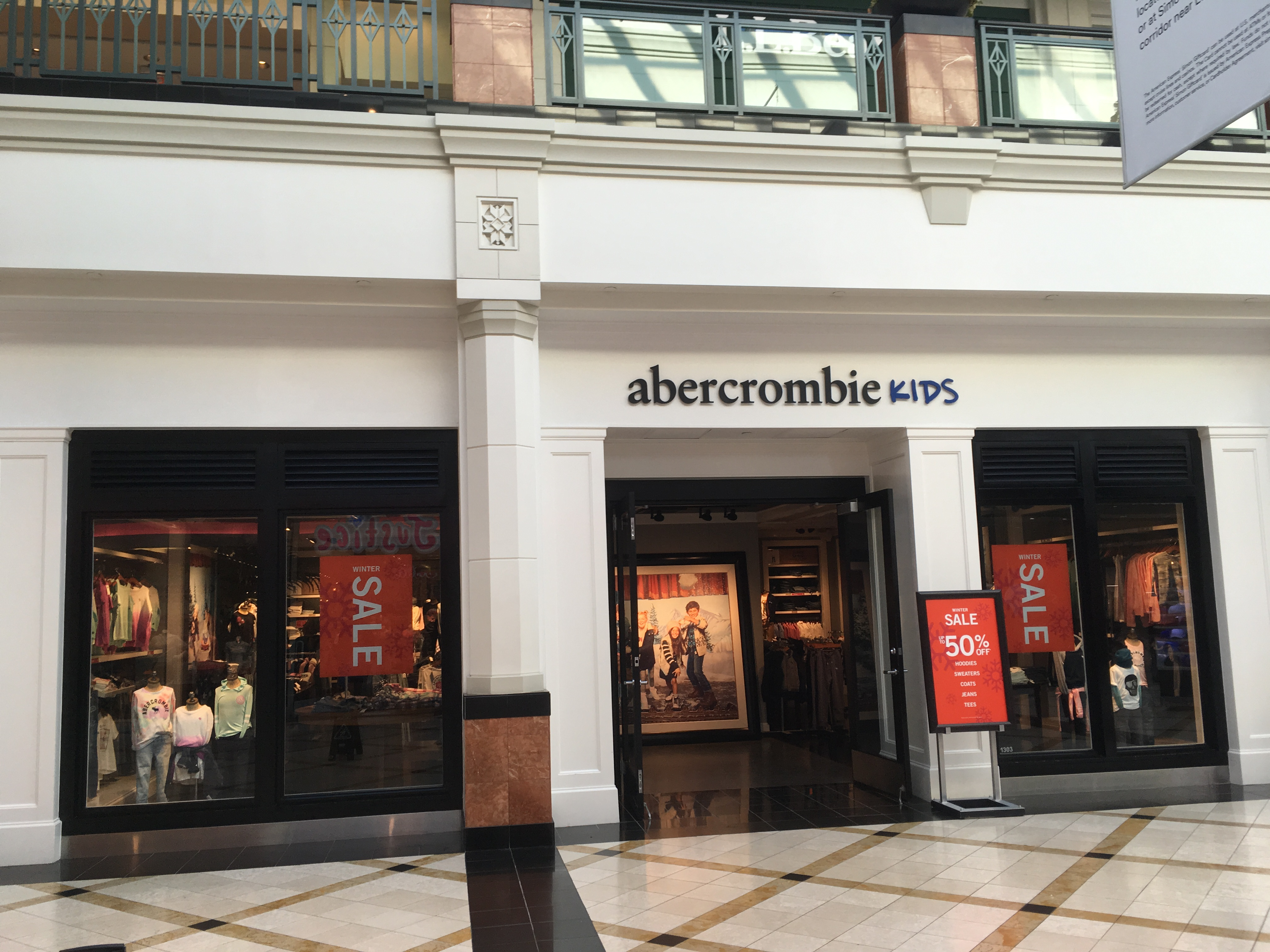
The abercrombie kids store at the King of Prussia Mall in King of Prussia, Pennsylvania

Abercrombie kids stores are designed to give off a "classic cool" effect. They are designed as "canoe stores," displaying a similar floor layout as Abercrombie & Fitch's (the retail space is divided into multiple rooms). However, the kids' prototype does bear differences. It has no louvers to cover the windows, has brighter lighting, is smaller in retail space, blasts electronic dance music and pop music from young artists, and displays marketing pictures with young models resembling those at A&F. The signature fragrance, "Fierce", is sprayed store-wide. As of August 2012, abercrombie operates a total of 154 stores in the United States.

The Abercrombie Kids brand began its international expansion when it opened its first Canadian store on August 21, 2008, at Sherway Gardens in Toronto, Ontario, Canada. Another abercrombie kids store opened at Toronto Eaton Centre in Toronto on November 26, 2008. It opened its first flagship store in Milan on October 29, 2009. It is located within the Abercrombie & Fitch Milanese flagship at 12 Corso Matteotti. The practice of placing abercrombie kids stores inside Abercrombie & Fitch flagship stores continued in Düsseldorf and Munich stores. There was one in the West Edmonton Mall, but it relocated inside the mall's Abercrombie & Fitch while the old location was replaced with a Microsoft Store. The store closed in 2022 and was the only Abercrombie Kids left in Western Canada, the only 2 are still open are in the Toronto Eaton Centre and Sherway Gardens in Toronto.

As of May 2015, there are 101 standalone Abercrombie Kids stores in the United States, two in Canada, and one in the United Kingdom. Abercrombie Kids "carve-outs" occupy space in Abercrombie & Fitch's flagship stores in Italy and Germany, as well as in fourteen full-line Abercrombie & Fitch stores in the United States and Canada. The abercrombie kids "carve-out" locations are an initial attempt for Abercrombie & Fitch to phase out the brand, similar to how Gilly Hicks items were placed in Hollister Co. stores shortly before Gilly Hicks folded in 2013.

== Abercrombie kids goods ==
Abercrombie kids' apparel is designed to mimic Abercrombie & Fitch clothing, and the brand carries most of the styles that A&F does. Most abercrombie kids clothes that have the labeled moose on them are to resemble their parent company "Abercrombie & Fitch" but the kids signature moose is smaller to symbolize that they are children. The trademarked term, "classic cool", was used to promote the clothing on an in-store and website level from abercrombie and it acted as a more juvenile version of A&F's slogan "Casual Luxury". The "classic cool" trade mark was retired in 2007 along with Abercrombie and Fitch's "Casual Luxury". Jeans bear the same back-pocket-stitching pattern as A&F as well as the same fits respective to sex. The logo moose is prominently displayed on clothing as is the name "abercrombie" as well as the year of establishment, "1892" (Abercrombie & Fitch was itself established in 1892, but in reality, the children's line "abercrombie" was not started until 1998). Clothing is categorized within the "guys" and "girls" divisions. Price points are on par with those at sister brand Hollister Co.

The brand currently carries the following fragrance collections: "Fierce" cologne as well as "Play" and "Life" fragrances. The brand released the "abercrombie" cologne and perfume set previous to 2006; however, it was retired Christmas 2007. Chase and Spirit were released Christmas 2006 and were followed by Cologne 15 and Perfume 15 being released Christmas 2007. Chase and Spirit have begun the phasing-out process and have had their price reduced permanently, as of Fall 2010. New fragrance Phelps and Emerson were released for Christmas 2008. On July 9, 2010, the newest girl's fragrance was launched called "Hadley", while the newest guy's fragrance, "Clutch," was released as part of the Christmas floor-set 2010, and has a scent similar to that of "Fierce," although more age appropriate and subdued.

== Controversy ==
=== Sexually suggestive designs ===
Humor T-shirts from the brand have resulted in criticism and controversy. Many slogans are taken as degrading to girls (e.g. "I'm not allowed to date unless you're hot"). Some show arrogant messages or disrespectful slogans ("'I will make you an all-star on the walk of shame'"). There were anti-education slogans, such as: 'I'd do your homework, but I don't even do mine'; 'School is for catching up on sleep'. Girls' shirts were sold with slogans that typically show off their looks ("It's better being brunette", etc.). Perhaps the most controversial of all was the line of underwear for young girls with the sayings "Wink Wink" and "Eye Candy" screenprinted on them. Parents mounted storefront protests in outrage of the sexually-suggestive underwear. CEO and Chairman of the Board Mike Jeffries said to an interviewer that he did not think the underwear to be "bad", but more "cute."

In mid-2011, Today Show featured a segment on padded triangle bikini tops being marketed towards 7- to 16-year-old girls. The bikini was criticized as being "sexually ostentatious" and "promiscuous."

=== Proposed shop on Savile Row ===
In 2012, A&F announced plans that it would open its Abercrombie Kids shop at No. 3 on Savile Row, next door to Gieves & Hawkes. The building in question has cultural significance because it was the former home of Apple Corps and The Beatles once played on top of the roof. The plans drew criticism and opposition from the tailors of the Row, who were already unhappy about the presence of the main A&F store on Burlington Gardens at the end of the Row to begin with, which eventually led to a protest organized by The Chap magazine on Monday, April 23, 2012. During the consultation period, objections were lodged to Westminster City Council and in February 2013 the Council rejected many of A&F's proposals for the store, stating that the plans for fixed screens on the windows, shutting out light to create the nightclub feel, was “deeply flawed” and damaging to the character of the street and that the flagpoles that normally hang from Abercrombie & Fitch stores were “highly inappropriate” and branded the entire plans "utterly unacceptable." A&F appealed, and a public enquiry was scheduled for February 12. A&F was ultimately able to overcome the official objections and the store opened in September 2014.
