= Magalog =

A magalog is a promotional copy of a magazine, mostly in a 12-page catalog format. The name is a portmanteau of "magazine" and "catalog" and was coined and used by Gary Bencivenga, a direct response copywriter. Magalogs help introduce magazines to new readers, or function as a catalog formatted as a magazine. It can also help existing readers see new or upcoming changes, additions, or improvements to the magazine. An alternative use can include catalogs that are presented with content, not just advertising. Magalogs are used in other verticals and have been used successfully to sell dietary supplements, books, information products, and sports equipment. Magalogs vary in size from 8 pages to 64 pages. Results from magalogs are closely measured in order to determine the ROI of the mailing. An example of a magalog of the catalog style would be Mark, as published by Avon.

== Organization ==
Magalogs are constructed by using the most interesting or palatable material, called a 'hook', to interest the reader. They can also contain discount campaigns or gifts to the reader. They are designed to produce maximum enthusiasm and positive outlook for a brand.
