= Ezra Fitch =

American lawyer

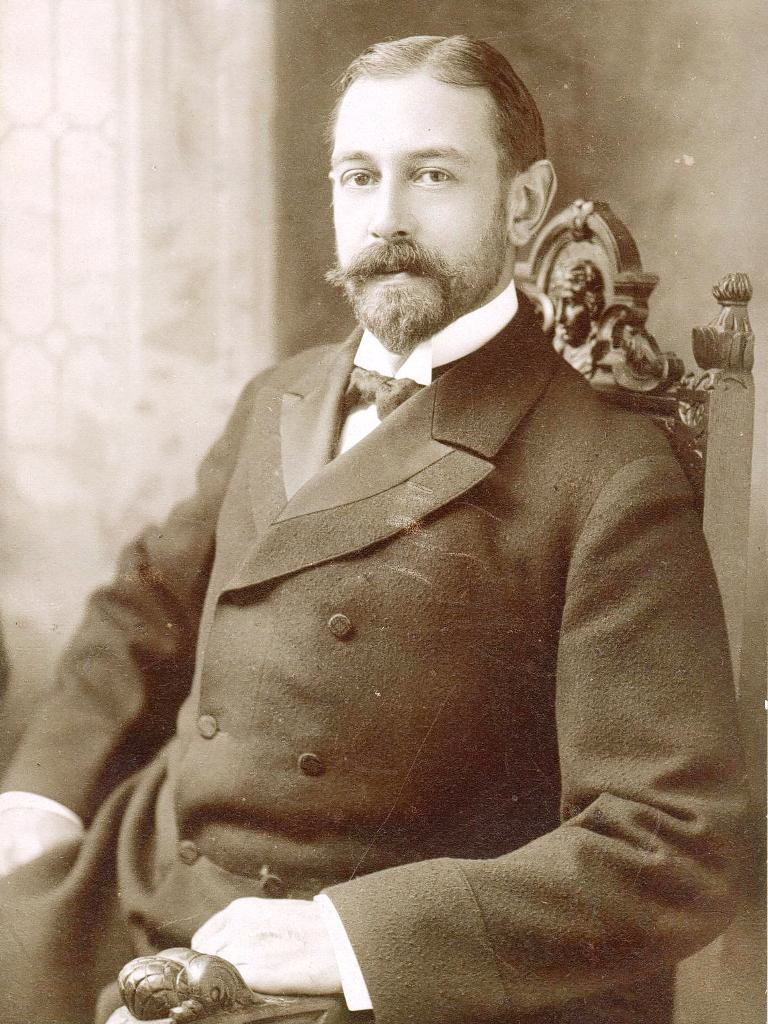
- Born: Ezra Hasbrouck Fitch; September 27, 1865; Coxsackie, New York, U.S.
- Died: June 16, 1930 (aged 64); Santa Barbara, California, U.S.
- Occupations: Co-founder of Abercrombie & Fitch, 1900; Sole owner, 1907 to 1928; Law practice, New York
- Years active: 1900–1928
- Known for: Fitch, part of company's modern name A&F Clothing line, "Ezra Fitch"; Fragrances "Ezra Fitch cologne" and "Ezra perfum" RUEHL No.925 apparel

Ezra Hasbrouck Fitch (September 27, 1865 – June 16, 1930) was an American real estate developer and hobbyist outdoorsman. He bought into and later fully owned the company that became Abercrombie & Fitch.

A wealthy New York City manager, Fitch began as one of Abercrombie's VIP customers. Fitch is attributed with much of the company's successful growth in its early years.

== Life and career ==
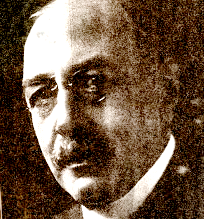
Ezra Fitch in 1930

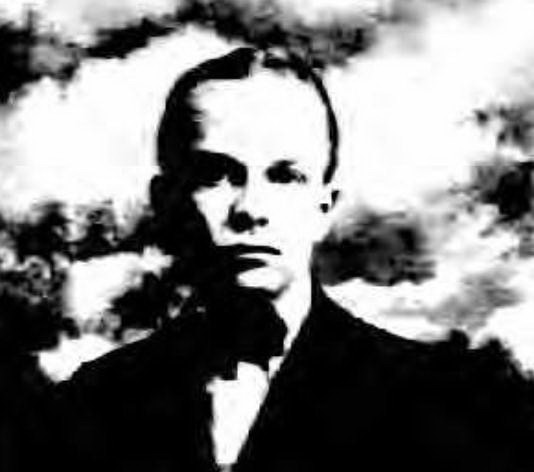
Ezra Fitch, portrait from passport application

Ezra Hasbrouck Fitch was born September 27, 1865, in Coxsackie, Greene County, New York. He was the only child in a Christian family. His parents were Roswell Reed Fitch and Margaretta Wyanna Hasbrouck. Roswell (1841-1888) was the son of Ezra Fitch (1805–1870) and Margaret Reed (1802–1884). Margaretta (1846-1865) was the daughter of Benjamin Louis Hasbrouck (1813–1885) and Margaret Rymph (1812–1880). Ezra's mother died shortly after his birth. His father would remarry, on July 17, 1873, to Helen Eldridge Carswell (1847–1950). She would be referred to as Ezra's mother (though she wasn't biologically). Roswell and Helen had two daughters: Helen Margaret Fitch Cobb (1874–1978) and Eloise Madden Fitch (1880–1902).

Ezra spent his early years growing up at the Roswell Reed estate on the banks of the Hudson in Coxsackie built by his grandfather around 1850. The estate included a large Gothic Revival mansion, numerous dependent structures and a dock on the river from which the family conducted a profitable freighting business. R. R. Fitch lived in Brooklyn for a time, working as an agent for an asphalt company.

He married Sarah Huntington Sturges in Brooklyn on March 2, 1897. She was the daughter of Stephen Buckingham Sturges (1827–1897), a banker, who was born in Mansfield, Ohio, and Sarah Minerva Cary (1833-) of Syracuse, New York. He was engaged as a real estate developer in Kingston, New York, trading as Jenkins & Fitch. The company built the Huntington apartment house there, among other projects.

According to the A&F company, Fitch was "restless and bored with his profession". He enjoyed the outdoors, and spent his leisure time yachting, climbing the Adirondacks and fishing in the streams of the Catskills. When David Abercrombie opened his excursions store Abercrombie Co. in 1892, Fitch became the store's "most devoted customer." In 1900, Fitch bought a major share into the ever-successfully growing company and thus became partners with Abercrombie: supposedly he had to "[convince]" Abercrombie into it. By 1904, Fitch's surname was incorporated into the company's name as "Abercrombie & Fitch Co." A&F calls Fitch an innovator, and claims that "it can't be done" was not in his vocabulary.

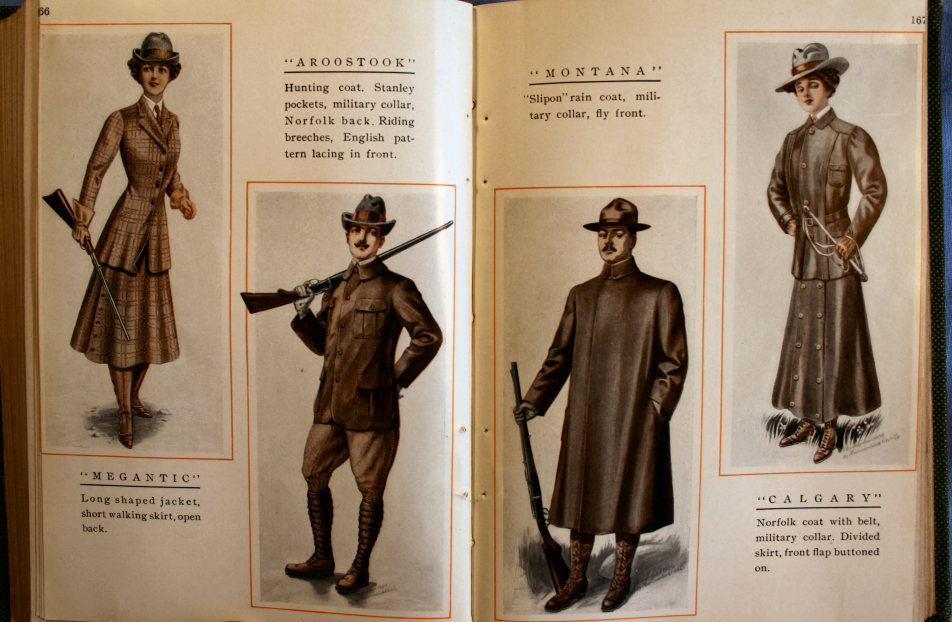
Inside the 1909 catalog featuring apparel for men and women.

Although both men shared financial success with the company, they became rather an annoyance to one another as is common in company partnerships. Fitch disputed with Abercrombie about who best to manage the company. Fitch wanted to expand the company to the general public, whereas Abercrombie, who was conservative, wanted the company to remain as a store for the elite. In the end, Abercrombie sold his share to Fitch in 1907.

During the Fitch era of the Abercrombie & Fitch Co., the company experienced great success. Fitch expanded and managed the company to great levels of popularity. He created its first mail-order catalog, released in 1909.

The historical introduction of Mahjong to the United States from China has been attributed to Fitch as merchandise in the Abercrombie & Fitch store in 1920.

== Later life and death ==
In 1928, Fitch retired from the company, leaving it under new management. He died on June 16, 1930, on his newly built 60-foot cruising yacht Content at Santa Barbara, California, only a few days after moving on to the boat. The ship's Captain A.Van Valin, wrote to the builders, Fellows & Stewart, asking them to re-sell the yacht. The Content was eventually sold. The ship spent four decades in British Columbia, where it was later purchased by a private citizen in 2010. Fitch is buried in Washington, Connecticut, where he lived. His wife, a painter, lived until 1960.

Fitch was Anglican/Episcopalian.

== Personal life and family ==
Fitch and his wife, Sara, had one daughter, Edith Sturges Fitch (March 6, 1901 – December 24, 1991); she married Paul Fessenden Cruikshank (October 1, 1898 – December 4, 1985) on June 26, 1923, in Washington, Connecticut, and had three daughters and a son.

Fitch's grandfather, Ezra Fitch (for whom he is named), was a businessman who operated sloops on the Hudson River in the Wilbur section of Kingston, New York, with his brother-in-law, Roswell Reed Jr. They had purchased the business from another of Fitch's brother-in-laws, Theron Skeel. Fitch also built a hotel on Abeel Street in Kingston to accommodate guests on his boats. Fitch would later sell his boat interests and entered the bluestone business with his brother Simeon and cousin William B. Fitch. It was due to Fitch's activity in Kingston that Fitch Street is named for him (and Ezra H. Fitch).

Fitch's paternal aunt, Harriet Fitch (1840–1932), married his maternal uncle, John Cornelius Hasbrouck (1840–1901), making their children double first cousins of Ezra. His paternal grandparents, Ezra and Margaret Fitch, were second cousins. His maternal grandparents, Benjamin and Margaret Hasbrouck, were fourth cousins through the Hasbrouck family.
