= Ruehl No.925 =

Clothing brand

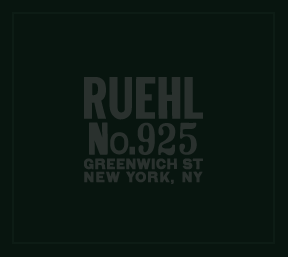
- Company type: Division
- Industry: Retail
- Founded: September 2004; 21 years ago
- Defunct: January 2010; 16 years ago
- Headquarters: New Albany, Ohio, U.S.
- Number of locations: 29
- Area served: United States
- Key people: Mike Jeffries (CEO)
- Revenue: $50.2 million USD (2007)
- Owner: Abercrombie & Fitch

Trubble embroidered

Ruehl No.925 was an upscale clothing brand owned by Abercrombie & Fitch, selling apparel, leather goods, and luxury goods. Themed after New York City's Greenwich Village, the store was meant to attract post-graduate individuals aged 22 to 35, competing primarily with J.Crew, Polo Ralph Lauren, and American Eagle Outfitters' equally short-lived spinoff Martin + Osa. Ruehl was the only brand in the Abercrombie portfolio that sold clothing in the color black.

The first Ruehl No.925 stores opened on September 24, 2004 at Westfield Garden State Plaza in Paramus, New Jersey, Woodfield Mall in Schaumburg, Illinois, and at International Plaza and Bay Street in Tampa, Florida.

Similar to Abercrombie & Fitch's moose logo and Hollister Co.'s seagull, Ruehl featured a French bulldog named "Trubble" embroidered on its clothing and accessories.

On June 17, 2009, Abercrombie & Fitch announced it would cease operations of the Ruehl brand.

== History ==
=== Conception ===
After the financial success of Hollister in 2000, Mike Jeffries began developing three additional retail concepts. The first of these to be revealed was Ruehl in September 2004, which targeted 20-to-30 somethings. According to the company, the store took its name from the Ruehl family, who moved from Germany in the mid-19th century and opened a leather goods emporium at 925 Greenwich Street in Manhattan. However, there is no Ruehl family and the address doesn't exist.

The first location opened at the International Plaza and Bay Street mall in Tampa, Florida, followed by Woodfield Mall in Chicago, and the third at the Garden State Plaza in Paramus, New Jersey. These stores were used to test the market before future expansion. While the clothing was similar to that of Abercrombie & Fitch, Ruehl was priced 22% higher.

=== Stores ===
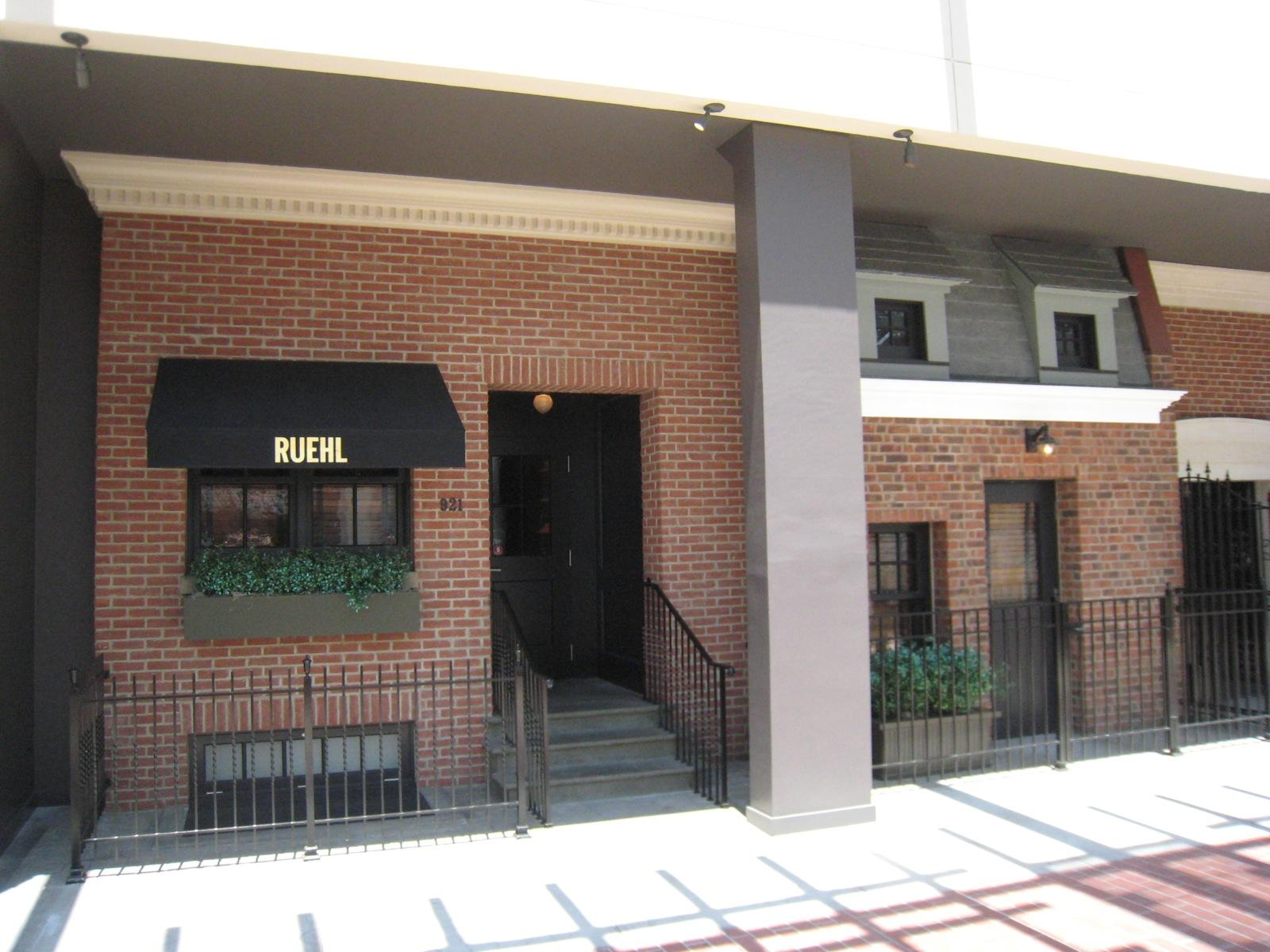
Ruehl storefront at Fashion Valley Mall.

Ruehl's storefront was made to look like a Manhattan townhouse with a brick facade, wrought-iron fence, and potted topiary. The interior was sectioned off into numerous bedrooms, living rooms, and conservatories meant to mimic the interior of a home. Bookshelves lined the "living room", chandeliers hung from the ceiling of the "bedrooms", portraits sat on the floor, tilted against walls, and a central hallway divided the store in half.

==== Locations ====
At the time of the concept's closure, Ruehl had 29 full-line store locations in the United States:

- Westfield Topanga – Canoga Park, California
- Americana at Brand – Glendale, California
- Westfield San Francisco Centre – San Francisco, California
- Fashion Valley Mall – San Diego, California
- The Oaks – Thousand Oaks, California
- Fashion Show Mall – Las Vegas, Nevada
- Aventura Mall – Aventura, Florida
- International Plaza and Bay Street – Tampa, Florida
- Westfield Annapolis – Annapolis, Maryland
- Oakbrook Center – Oak Brook, Illinois
- Woodfield Mall – Schaumburg, Illinois
- Burlington Mall – Burlington, Massachusetts
- Natick Mall – Natick, Massachusetts
- Ala Moana Center – Honolulu, Hawaii
- Twelve Oaks Mall – Novi, Michigan
- Mall of America – Bloomington, Minnesota
- Westfield Garden State Plaza – Paramus, New Jersey
- Freehold Raceway Mall – Freehold Township, New Jersey
- Walden Galleria – Buffalo, New York
- Smith Haven Mall – Lake Grove, New York
- Roosevelt Field – Garden City, New York
- Easton Town Center – Columbus, Ohio
- The Domain – Austin, Texas
- Galleria Dallas – Dallas, Texas
- The Shops at La Cantera – San Antonio, Texas
- Washington Square – Tigard, Oregon
- Tysons Corner Center – McLean, Virginia

The brand also operated one off-mall accessories store, a 600 sq ft (56 m^{2}) store at 370 Bleecker Street, New York City, New York.

== Levi Strauss lawsuit ==
In July 2007, Levi Strauss & Co. filed a lawsuit against Abercrombie & Fitch for trademark infringement, alleging that Ruehl jeans and other products used Levi's trademarked pocket design of connected arches. Levi's filed a similar suit against Polo Ralph Lauren.
