= American Decency Association =

American advocacy group (1999-)

Coordinates: 43°28′02.20″N 85°56′29.00″W

- Founded: 1999; 27 years ago by Bill Johnson
- Type: Christian right organization
- Location: (United States) Fremont, Michigan, U.S.
- Key people: Bill Johnson, President
- Website: www.americandecency.org

The American Decency Association (ADA) is a non-profit organization associated with the Christian right based in Fremont, Michigan. Its principal cause is against pornography and "indecent" media. The ADA was founded in 1999 by former elementary school teacher, Bill Johnson, the first-named state director of the American Family Association (AFA) from 1987 to 1999. The organization was formerly known as the Michigan chapter of the AFA.

== Activism ==
In 2006, the ADA opposed the distribution of a calendar depicting Detroit Pistons dance group, "Automotion" members in swimsuits. The calendar was given away to fans during a December basketball game, and then sold to legal adults for $13 in Pistons' stores. A member of the ADA described the calendar as "legalized prostitution." The ADA opposed the calendar by means of its e-mail newsletter, and said that since the basketball team counted women and young children among its fans, the calendar was inappropriate. The proceeds of the calendar went to charity.

In January 2006, Brother Rice High, a Michigan Catholic school disinvited Automotion to an alumni fundraising event after repeated urging by the ADA. The ADA held that the event "legitimizes pornography and the objectification of women." Though the high school's decision was made in response to public pressure instead of an admission of wrongdoing by the principal, the ADA still viewed it as a victory. The dancers planned to donate their time to the fundraising event.

== Supporters ==
The ADA receives some funding from the Holland, Michigan-based Prince Foundation (formerly the Edgar and Elsa Prince Foundation), which funds many other Christian right groups.
