= Lifestyle brand =

Identification for a good or service; marketing based on a common value of a subculture

A lifestyle brand is a brand that is intended to embody the values, aspirations, interests, attitudes, or opinions of a group or a culture for marketing purposes. Lifestyle brands seek to inspire, guide, and motivate people, with the goal of making their products contribute to the definition of the consumer's way of life. As such, they are closely associated with the advertising and other promotions used to gain mind share in their target market. They often operate from an ideology, hoping to attract a relatively high number of people and ultimately become a recognised social phenomenon.

A lifestyle brand is an ideology created by a brand. An organisation achieves a lifestyle brand by evoking an emotional connection with its customers, creating a consumer desire to be affiliated with a particular group or brand. The consumer will believe that their identity will be reinforced if they publicly associate themselves with a particular lifestyle brand, for example by using a brand on social media.

As individuals have different experiences, choices, and backgrounds (including social class, ethnicity, and culture), an organisation must understand to whom it directs its brand. By constructing a lifestyle brand ideology, an organisation's goal is to become a recognised social phenomenon.

Lifestyle brand marketing uses market research to segment target markets based on psychographics rather than demographics.

They are often characterized by exclusive owners clubs and intensive social activities.

== Definition ==
Lifestyle brands operate from the idea that each individual has an identity based on their choices, experiences, and background (e.g., ethnicity, social class, subculture, nationality, etc.). Lifestyle brands evoke emotional connections between a consumer and that consumer's desire to affiliate him or herself with a group. Lifestyle brands are one of the possible ways of consumer self-expression: customers believe that their identity will be reinforced or supplemented if they publicly associate themselves with a lifestyle brand or other symbol-intensive brands.

=== Factors that influence the consumer decision process ===
Consumers continually face multiple decisions with regard to product choice due to many competing products. Aspects such as a product's attributes have been shown to be involved in the consumer decision process. A number of factors affect a consumer's choice of product brand, which influences their lifestyle. Consumers choose a brand that is acceptable to their self-image that they are trying to portray. Companies have to re-establish and reposition their products to ensure they meet the lifestyle a consumer is trying to obtain. They have an opportunity to refine their target market which would limit competition due to a reduced number in consumers who would be attracted to their specific brand because of the way they might perceive their lifestyle.

Consumers evaluate product attributes as opposed to a case by case assessment. There is the need for brands to be understood and how they can be influential with regard to consumer's decision making considerations. Three processes are intertwined in choice behaviour: psychological, sociological, and economic processes. Within these three processes lifestyle of the consumer also becomes intertwined with consumers tending to choose a brand they feel is congruent with their self-image, their identity – who they feel they are and what they connect with the most. P Vyncke suggests that a consumer's values, goals, and vision for their life, along with aesthetic style all reflect individual lifestyle.

=== Consumer self-expression ===
Consumers use brands to express their identity. The need for self-expression can be related to the need for acceptance within society and the societal view on brands and how different brands portray income or wealth. Lifestyle brands allow customers to express themselves and portray their identity and lifestyle. Lifestyle brands in particular portray a type of meaning that allows a particular reference group to attach themselves based on their lifestyle, values or beliefs.

=== Perceived brand value ===
If a consumer loves fashion this will have a positive effect on his/her willingness to pay for a luxury, top-end brand. In order for a lifestyle brand to be successful and dominate market share it needs to enhance customers experiences and provide more than just a product. Consumers are more willing and likely to purchase a brand that establishes itself as to value and satisfaction. Brand value is defined as comparing focal brands with unbranded products that have had the same level or same ways of marketing to consumers, as well as adopting the same product attributes. Luxury brands are extending their perceived value beyond tangible goods by incorporating curated cafe and dining experiences into their portfolios as part of the luxury experience.

Luxury brands target those that have an extreme lifestyle. Price is never a factor. Three categories are identified as measuring brand value: brand loyalty, perceived value and brand awareness/association. Consumers associate themselves with luxury fashion brands to portray their lifestyle and separate them from the rest. Social value is an aspect that relates to consumers' desire to obtain luxury brands that they hope will offer them a symbolic part of a group or culture. There are emotional factors that are connected to the consumption of a luxury brand: for example those that bring pleasure or excitement.

=== Retail brands ===
Lifestyle retail branding is the way in which retailers refine their products or services to interest lifestyles in specific market segments. Examples of lifestyle retail brands include the now defunct Laura Ashley, GAP and Benetton. These retailers offer a distinct and recognised set of values to consumers. Over time, a number of retailers have come up with their own brand strategies and are now seen as lifestyle retail brands because they are targeting consumers who adopt their brand to align themselves with a lifestyle they want to obtain.

== Psychology ==
It is important for an organisation to understand its brand's role among consumers. To achieve this, an organisation must use the following aspects of the lifestyle brand model.

=== Brand categorisation ===
This is defined as a consumer sorting products or brands into categories, based on their past experiences with that brand. It is used to avoid confusion, as consumers may be overwhelmed when comparing one product with an extensive range of other brands of the same product. Categorisation helps consumers evaluate the quality of the product. For example, a consumer may choose to purchase an Apple iPhone over a Huawei mobile phone, as they may believe that the iPhone has a better camera quality.

=== Brand effect ===
This aspect is defined as the effect or influence a brand may have upon an organisation and its consumers. For example, Whole Foods can affect a consumer by going the extra mile to offer organic foods products that suit that particular consumer's needs.

=== Brand personality ===
This is when a brand encompasses a consistent set of traits in which the consumer can relate. For example, Crossfit is a lifestyle brand which encompasses the idea of pushing yourself for your fitness. This idea is consistent on a global level. Through this lifestyle, consumers or participants have the opportunity to feel a part of a group of healthy, motivated fitness fanatics.

=== Brand symbolism ===
This is defined as the strong symbolism that a brand transmits to its consumers, which is adopted for its social benefits. It allows consumers to feel as though they can express themselves through a form of identity, whilst being provided with a sense of belonging to a group. For example, Tiffany & Co. are a jewellery brand which offer affordable and expensive, high-quality jewellery products. When a person sees a consumer wearing its product in public, that person may aim to own a piece of Tiffany jewellery themselves, with the aim to seek social benefits or fit into a particular group.

=== Brand attachment ===
Attachment is brought about when people form an emotional connection between themselves and a brand. For example, Coca-Cola uses advertisements to portray its happy lifestyle to consumers. These advertisements are used to form an emotional connection with the audience. Through the use of the "Open happiness" slogan, consumers may believe that by purchasing and consuming a Coca-Cola drink, they will feel like they are happy and having fun.

== Examples ==
While some lifestyle brands purposely reference existing groups or cultures, others create a disruption within the status quo and propose an innovative viewpoint on the world. The driving force may be the product, the shopping experience, the service, the communication or a combination of these elements. These are often result from visionary goals of the CEO or founder. Early on, Apple's founder Steve Jobs sought to integrate the company's innovations into the industries of music, entertainment, and telecommunications. In 2002, he gifted each 7th- and 8th-grader in the state of Maine with a laptop, in an effort to show that it was not "about the technology, it's about what people can do with it." Lee Clow—the chairman of Omnicom Group's TBWA Worldwide and Apple marketing partner—said that Jobs had "a very rigorous view of Apple's tone of voice and the way it talks with people," calling it "very human, very accessible."

One popular source for lifestyle brands is also national identity. Victoria's Secret purposely evoked the English upper class in its initial branding efforts, while Burberry is recalling the hip London culture. Burberry's Autumn–Winter 2004 ready-to-wear collection connected the fashion line to the concept of the Bloomsbury girl, an aesthetic inspired by Virginia Woolf and the Bloomsbury publishing house.

Social or personal image is also a reference point for some lifestyle brands. In the 1990s, Abercrombie & Fitch successfully resuscitated a 1950s ideal—the white, masculine "beefcake"— during a time of political correctness and rejection of 1950s orthodoxy, creating a lifestyle brand based on a preppy, young, Ivy-League lifestyle. Their retail outlets reflect this lifestyle through their luxurious store environment, attractive store associates (models), and their black and white photographs featuring young people "living the Abercrombie & Fitch lifestyle". In doing so, Abercrombie & Fitch has created an outlet for those who lead, or wish to lead or wish to dream about leading this lifestyle.

Companies like home furnishing associate themselves with the term "lifestyle branding" when they are developing their brand portfolio. A furniture company is likely to align new product lines with lifestyle collections that are associated with fashion icons, celebrities and well-known interior designers. Ideally, this strategy improves the company's image to consumers and entices them to purchase home furnishings in order to aspire to the tastes of these influencers. Furniture companies have said that it helps them connect with those consumers who associate other categories with these celebrities. It is their way of tapping into new markets that have not yet been reached. Companies that have celebrity names associated with them provides a certain degree of guarantee to the brand.

A company called Doman Home Furnishings launched a campaign about food and kitchen products to enhance its brand as a lifestyle choice.

== Symbol-intensive brand ==
A symbol-intensive brand is a brand adopted not only for its functional benefits, but above all, for the strong symbolism and significance that it is able to transmit, allowing a consumer to express his or her identity, to signal status or manifest a sense of belonging to a group.

Businesses might be based on three different types of knowledge: analytical; synthetic or symbolic. Creative or cultural businesses, such as entertainment, publishing, design, or fashion, draw heavily on a symbolic knowledge base. They serve important symbolic functions such as capturing, refracting, and legitimating social knowledge and values. The essence of a brand or a product in these industries resides in its meaning for the consumer rather than in its function.

A symbol-intensive brand is a brand adopted not only for its functional benefits, but above all, for the strong symbolism and significance that it is able to transmit, allowing a consumer to express his or her identity, to signal status or manifest a sense of belonging to a group. The symbol-intensive brand definition was introduced by Stefania Saviolo and Antonio Marazza in the book Lifestyle Brands – A Guide to Inspirational Marketing. Analyzing a brand's choices in terms of competitive scope (number of targets and categories served) and type of benefits provided to the customer, five classes of symbol-intensive brands are identified:

1. Authority brands
2. Solution brands
3. Icon brands
4. Cult brands
5. Lifestyle brands

Symbol-intensive brands are able to maintain a relationship with their clients that goes beyond the usual brand loyalty. Clients tend to become ambassadors, fans, champions, that find the brand fundamental or irreplaceable in their lives. Researchers have noted superior economic and financial performances in brands capable of engaging people or influencing a social context proposing an original point of view.

== See also ==
- Status symbol
- Coolhunting
